= Fox Hall =

Fox Hall may refer to:

- Fox Hall, West Virginia
- Fox Hall (Westmore, Vermont), a historic house
- Fox Hall (Fitchburg, Wisconsin), a historic house
- Kenneth R. Fox Student Union, a building at the University of Massachusetts Lowell

== See also ==
- Foxhall (disambiguation)
