= Jerry E. Dickerman House =

Historic house in Vermont, United States

- U.S. National Register of Historic Places
- U.S. Historic district – Contributing property
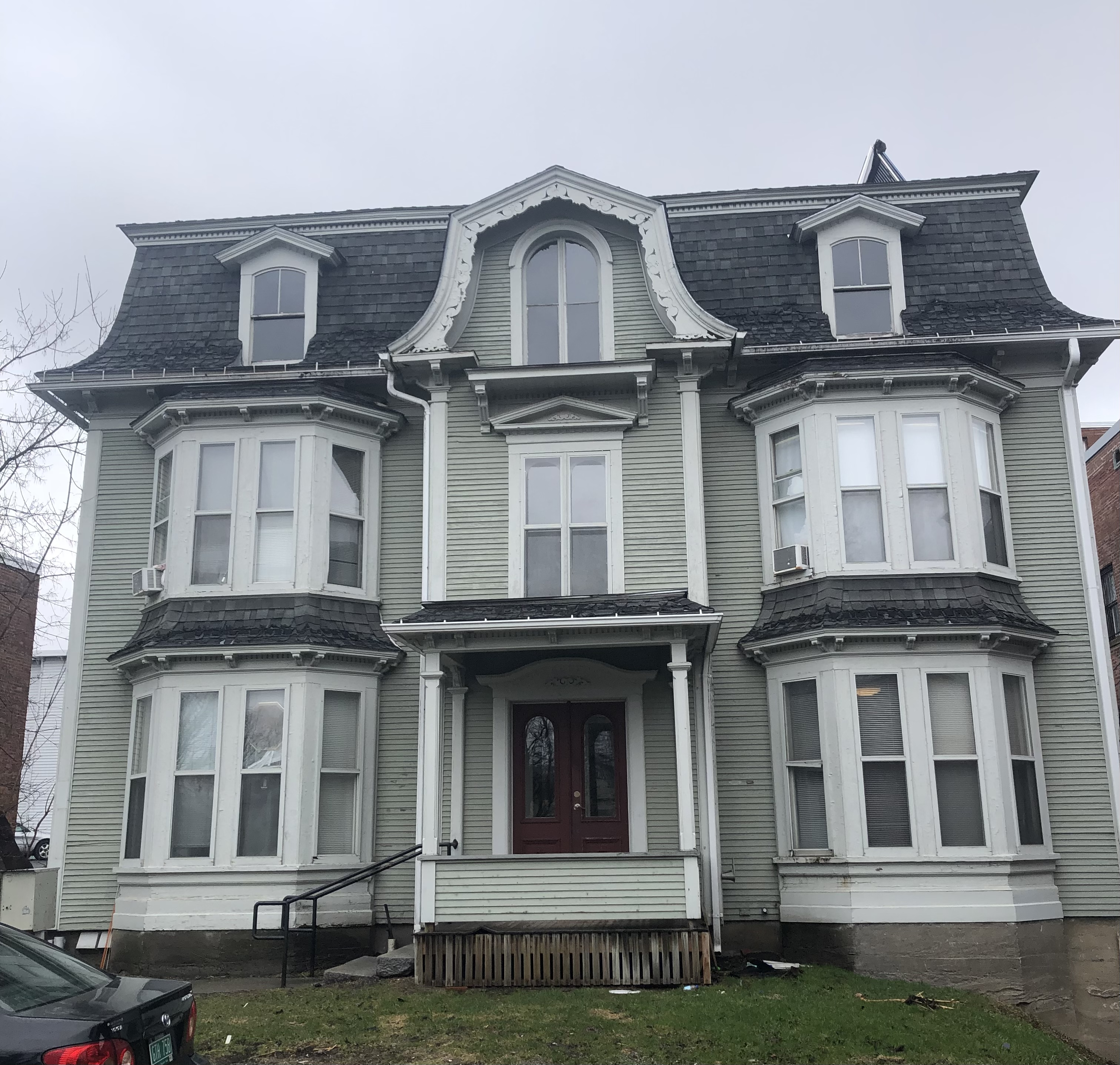

- Location within Vermont Location within the United States
- Location: 36 Field Ave., Newport, Vermont
- Coordinates: 44°56′10″N 72°12′38″W
- Area: 0.1 acres (0.040 ha)
- Built: 1875
- Architectural style: Second Empire
- Part of: Newport Downtown Historic District (ID06000898)
- NRHP reference No.: 01000732

Significant dates
- Added to NRHP: July 11, 2001
- Designated CP: September 28, 2006

The Jerry E. Dickerman House is a historic house at 36 Field Avenue in the city of Newport, Vermont. Built in 1875 for a prominent local lawyer and customs collector, it is a prominent regional example of residential Second Empire architecture. It was listed on the National Register of Historic Places in 2001.

== Description and history ==
The Jerry E. Dickerman House is located in downtown Newport, just north of the Goodrich Memorial Library on the east side of Field Avenue. It is a 2 1/2-story wood-frame structure, with a clapboarded exterior and dormered mansard roof, which provides a full third floor. The main facade is three bays wide, with the outer bays housing projecting polygonal window bays with bracketed roofs at each level. The central bay projects slightly, and is capped by a larger facade dormer with a bellcast roof outline surrounding a round-arch balcony door opening. The main entrance is at the ground level of this bay, sheltered by a porch with bracketed posts. The interior of the main section of the house retains much of its original woodwork, despite a mid-20th century conversion to apartments.

The house was built in approximately 1875, and was originally set facing Main Street, which was then lined by similarly fashionable houses of the community's upper class. It was moved to its present location in approximately 1930 to make room for a commercial building, and was converted into apartments in the 1940s or 1950s. Maps of the period show roughly half a dozen Second Empire houses, of which only two are known to remain.

== See also ==
- National Register of Historic Places listings in Orleans County, Vermont
