= House at 68 Highland Avenue =

- U.S. National Register of Historic Places
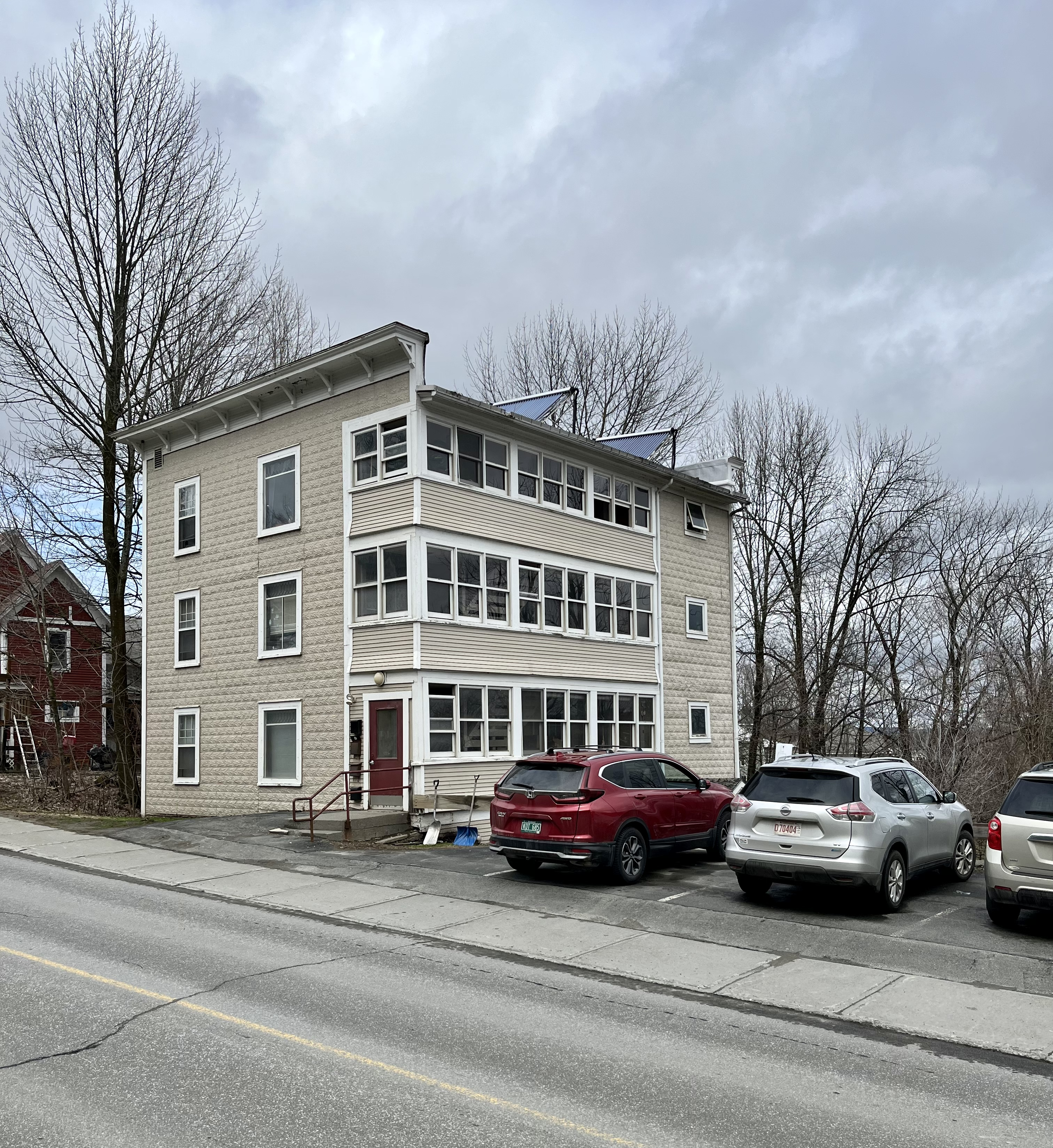

- Location within Vermont Location within the United States
- Location: 68 Highland Ave., Newport, Vermont
- Coordinates: 44°55′57″N 72°13′18″W
- Area: less than one acre
- Built: 1919
- Architectural style: Colonial Revival
- NRHP reference No.: 00000831
- Added to NRHP: July 20, 2000

68 Highland Avenue is a historic apartment building in the city of Newport, Vermont. Built about 1919, it is a well-preserved example of typical Vermont multi-unit housing of the period, retaining a number of distinctive Colonial Revival features, including pressed-metal siding. It was listed on the National Register of Historic Places in 2000.

== Description and history ==
Highland Avenue (Vermont Route 105) is a major secondary road leading from the center of Newport to the rural communities to its west. Number 68 is located at the northwest corner of Highland with West End Avenue, in a residential area west of the downtown. It is a three-story wood-frame structure, set on a steeply sloping lot that fully exposes most of the basement level on three sides. It is covered by a flat roof, and is finished in original pressed metal siding. The street-facing front facade has a false-front corniced parapet that exaggerates the building's height. The front facade is three bays wide, with windows occupying all of the bays except the rightmost ground floor bay, which houses the building entrance. The rightmost bays form the fronts of an enclosed three-story porch and stairhouse, its openings enclosed in bands of sash windows, with skirting of wooden clapboards between the levels. The interior retains original woodwork and finishes.

The construction of 68 Highland Avenue was prompted by demand for worker housing at the Newport's growing industries in the early 20th century. The area where it stands was at the time a working-class residential area, and its early occupants were generally employed in Newport's industries. The building has had a succession of private owners. The pressed metal exterior, which was fairly common in these sorts of uses in the period, is a rare surviving original.

== See also ==
- National Register of Historic Places listings in Orleans County, Vermont
