= Ai J. White Duplex =

- U.S. National Register of Historic Places
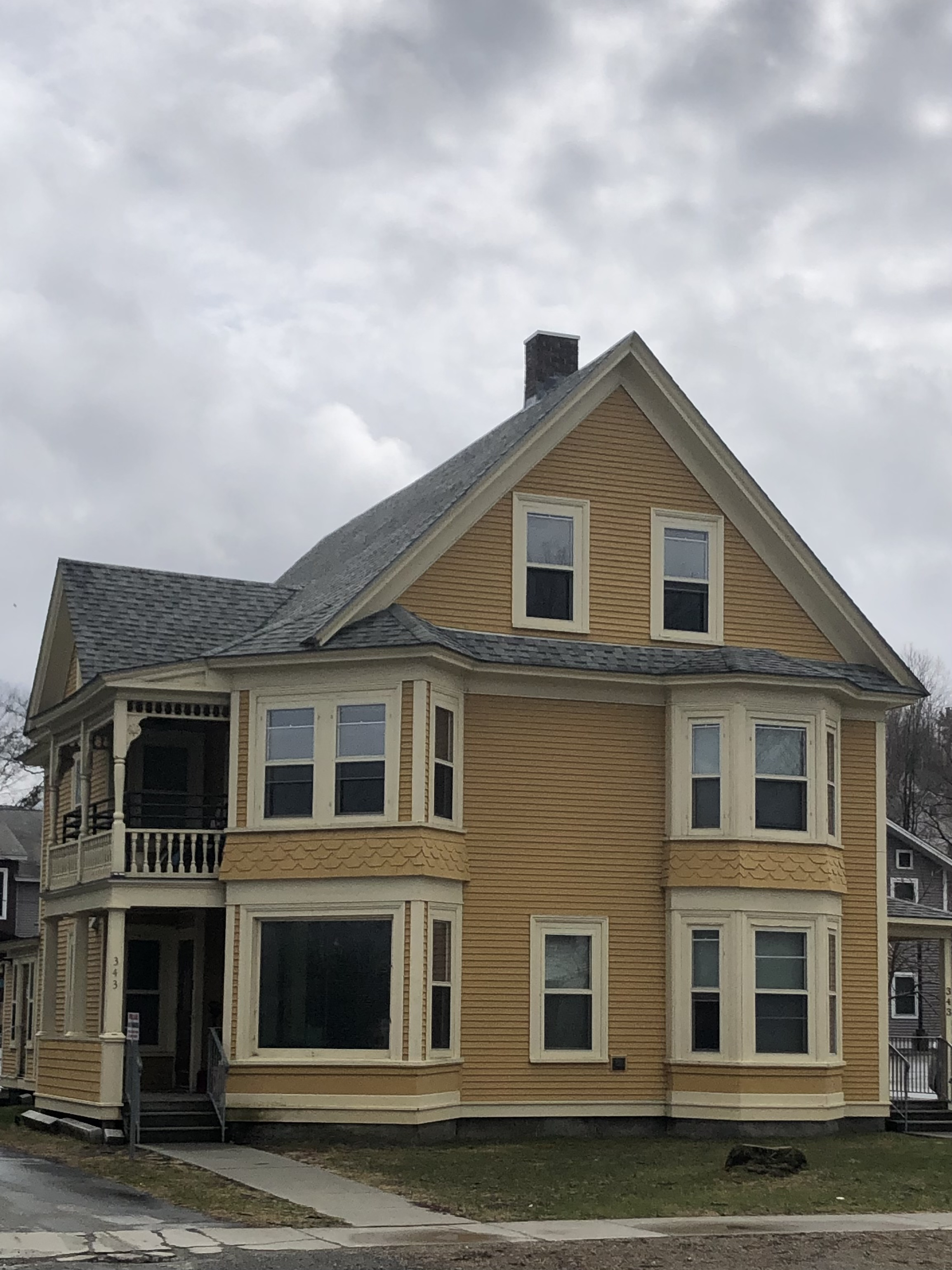

- Location within Vermont Location within the United States
- Location: 343 Main St., Newport, Vermontf
- Coordinates: 44°56′4″N 72°12′46″W
- Area: less than one acre
- Built: 1897
- Architectural style: Queen Anne
- NRHP reference No.: 11000516
- Added to NRHP: August 4, 2011

The Ai J. White Duplex is a historic two-unit residential building at 343 Main Street in the city of Newport, Vermont, United States. Built about 1897, it is a well-preserved example of multi-unit Queen Anne architecture. It was listed on the National Register of Historic Places in 2011.

== Description and history ==
The Ai J. White Duplex stands just west of the main downtown area of Newport, on the south side of Main Street roughly midway between 3rd Street and Governor Drive. It is a 2 1/2-story wood-frame structure, with a cross-gabled roof and an exterior clad in a combination of wooden clapboards and decorative cut shingles. Its front facade is roughly in three bays, with the right bay consisting of a two-story projecting polygonal window bay, and the left bay consisting of an angled rectangular bay with a picture window on the ground floor and a pair of sash windows on the second. The center bay has a single sash window on the ground floor, and none on the second. Entrance porches are on either side, with turned posts and balusters. The left porch is two stories high, with a spindled valance on the second floor.

The house was built about 1897 by Ai J. White, a French Canadian immigrant. White owned a shop at the back of the property where he manufactured window sashes and blinds, and apparently built this duplex as an income-producing property. Most of its documented occupants have been working-class laborers, but it was also occupied early in the 20th century by Leon Colodny, a German-Russian immigrant who owned one of Newport's downtown commercial blocks. It was sold out of the White family in 1943.

== See also ==
- National Register of Historic Places listings in Orleans County, Vermont
