= Orleans County Courthouse and Jail Complex =

- U.S. National Register of Historic Places
- U.S. Historic district – Contributing property
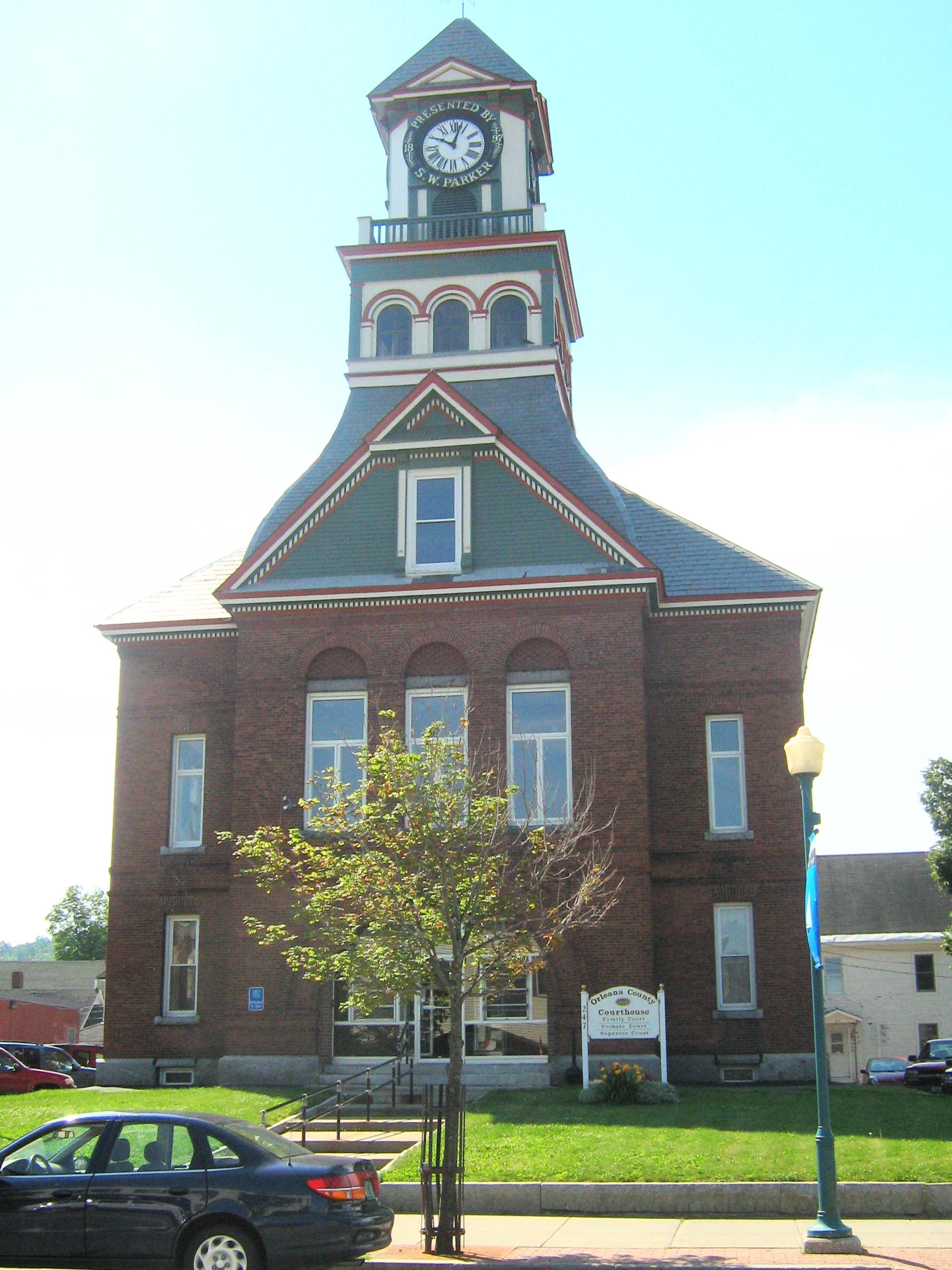

- Location within Vermont Location within the United States
- Interactive map showing the location for Orleans County Courthouse Complex
- Location: Main St., Newport, Vermont
- Coordinates: 44°56′6″N 72°12′39″W
- Area: 0.3 acres (0.12 ha)
- Built: 1886
- Architect: Packard, Lambert
- Architectural style: Queen Anne, Romanesque
- Part of: Newport Downtown Historic District (ID06000898)
- NRHP reference No.: 84000336

Significant dates
- Added to NRHP: November 23, 1984
- Designated CP: September 28, 2006

The Orleans County Courthouse and Jail Complex is a historic government facility on Main Street in the city of Newport, Vermont, the shire town of Orleans County. The complex includes a fine Romanesque courthouse built in 1886, a wood-frame jailer's quarters built in 1886 (now housing the sheriff's office), and a 1903 brick jail. The complex was listed on the National Register of Historic Places in 1984.

== Description and history ==
The Orleans County Courthouse stands prominently in the center of downtown Newport, on the south side of Main Street between 3rd and 2nd Streets. Just to its east stands the federal U.S. Courthouse, Post Office and Customs House. It is a 2 1/2-story brick building, with a hip roof. A gabled entrance section protrudes from the center of the main facade, rising through a stage at the roof level to a two-stage clock tower topped by a pyramidal roof. The eaves and gable edges have dentil moulding, and windows in the upper level of the projecting section are set in recessed round-arch openings, a detail echoed by blind arches in the first stage of the tower. Entrances are also set in large round-arch openings on the ground floor. Bands of brick corbelling set off the floors from each other, with another below the eave.

The 1886 jailer's house was a two-story wood-frame structure with a gabled roof, and was three bays wide and two deep. It was simply trimmed, and was connected via a wooden ell to the 1903 jail. That building was a basically cubical masonry structure, two stories in height, finished in brick with granite trim. It had a hip roof with an elaborate corbelled eave. The jail was razed in 2022 along with the sheriff’s office and residence.

The county complex was built in 1886, following a decision by the state legislature to move the seat of Orleans County from Irasburg, centrally located but isolated and agrarian, to the bustling lakefront and railroad-supported town of Newport. The city of Newport would be incorporated in 1918 out of part of the towns of Newport and Derby, and retain the shire town status. The courthouse was designed by Lambert Packard, a prominent local architect. He also designed the original 1886 jail, which was deemed inadequate for the county's needs and replaced in 1903 by a "mail order" structure designed by the Pauly Jail Company of St. Louis, Missouri.

== See also ==
- National Register of Historic Places listings in Orleans County, Vermont
