= United States Courthouse, Post Office and Customs House (Newport, Vermont) =

- U.S. Courthouse, Post Office and Customs House
- U.S. National Register of Historic Places
- U.S. Historic district – Contributing property
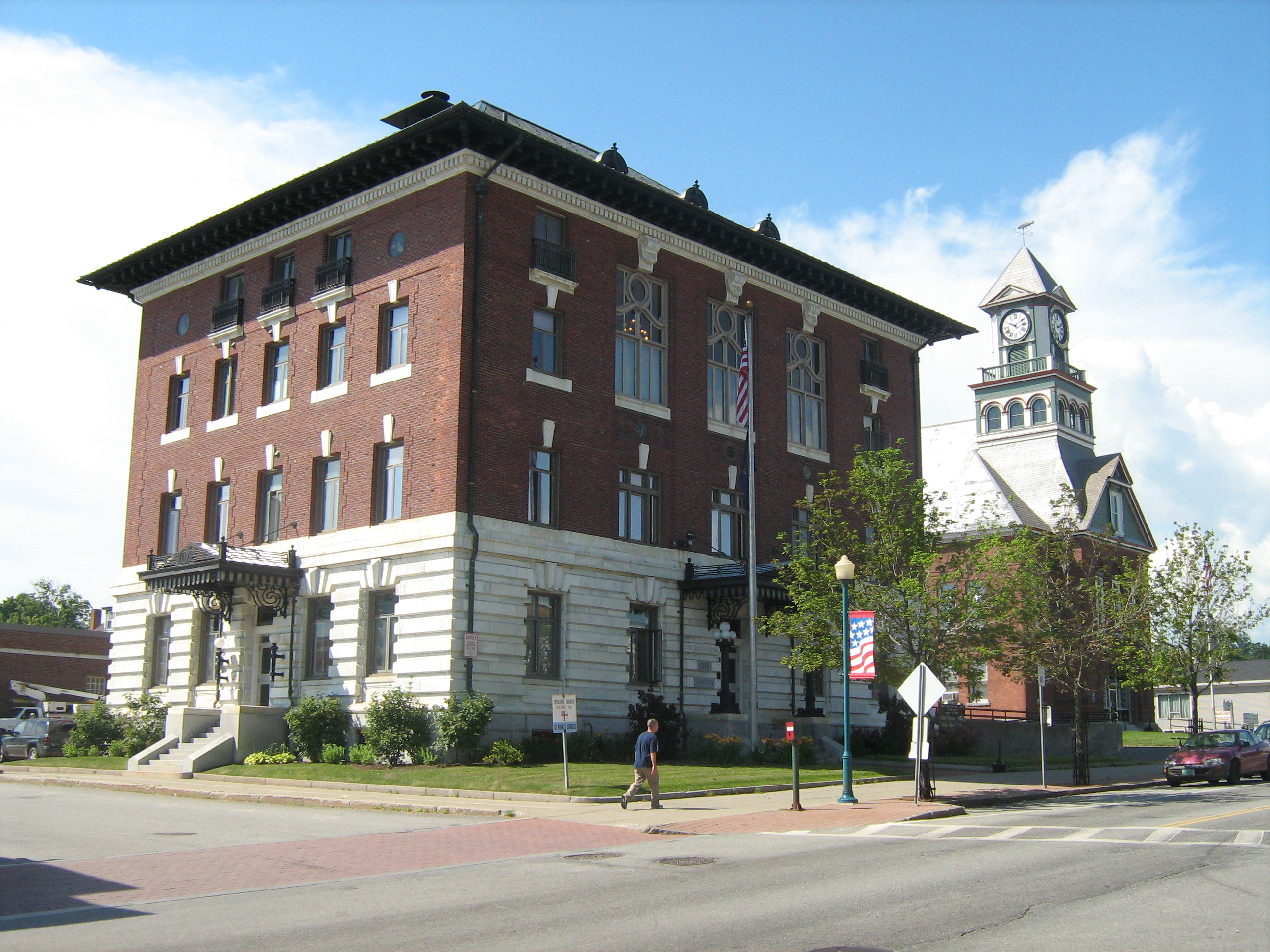

- Location within Vermont Location within the United States
- Location: 217 Main St., Newport, Vermont
- Coordinates: 44°56′0″N 72°12′40″W
- Area: less than one acre
- Built: 1903-04
- Architect: James Knox Taylor
- Part of: Newport Downtown Historic District (ID06000898)
- NRHP reference No.: 76000144

Significant dates
- Added to NRHP: December 12, 1976
- Designated CP: September 28, 2006

The U.S. Courthouse, Post Office and Customs House, also just known as the Federal Building, is a historic federal government building at Main and 2nd Streets in downtown Newport, Vermont. Completed in 1904, it served historically as a courthouse, as a customhouse, and as a post office, and is the city's tallest building. It was listed on the National Register of Historic Places in 1976.

== Description and history ==
The US Federal Building is prominently located in downtown Newport, at the southwest corner of Main and Second Streets. It is just east of the Orleans County Courthouse and Jail Complex, and across Main Street from Newport City Hall. It is four stories in height, built out load-bearing brick and stone. The ground floor is finished in gray marble divided by deep bands, and appears as a raised basement. The upper floors are finished in red brick laid in Flemish bond. The second and third-floor windows are set in rectangular openings with marble keystones and sills, while the short fourth level appears to be a raised element of the third floor. A projecting cornice with dentillated entablature extends around the building.

When completed in 1904, the building housed all of the federal facilities in Newport, including courts, post office, and customs offices. It served the United States District Court for the District of Vermont from 1904 to 1948. Its interior ground floor was extensively remodeled in 1930 to improve the post office facilities, and was again redone after the post office moved out in 1967. The building now houses the Orleans County District Court.

== See also ==
- List of United States federal courthouses in Vermont
- National Register of Historic Places listings in Orleans County, Vermont
