= National Register of Historic Places listings in Orleans County, Vermont =

Location of Orleans County in Vermont

This is a list of the National Register of Historic Places listings in Orleans County, Vermont.

This is intended to be a complete list of the properties and districts on the National Register of Historic Places in Orleans County, Vermont, United States. Latitude and longitude coordinates are provided for many National Register properties and districts; these locations may be seen together in a map.

There are 29 properties and districts listed on the National Register in the county.

This National Park Service list is complete through NPS recent listings posted August 21, 2026.

Contents: Counties in Vermont
Addison - Bennington - Caledonia - Chittenden - Essex - Franklin - Grand Isle - Lamoille - Orange - Orleans - Rutland - Washington - Windham - Windsor

== Current listings ==
	Name on the Register	Image	Date listed	Location	City or town	Description
1	Brownington Village Historic District	Brownington Village Historic District	May 9, 1973 (#73000197)	Hinman and Brownington Centers Rd. 44°50′19″N 72°10′10″W	Brownington	
2	Crystal Lake Falls Historic District	Crystal Lake Falls Historic District	July 7, 1994 (#94000699)	Roughly, Water St. from Church St. to Main St., Main from Water to Duck Pond Rd. and West St. from Cemetery Rd. to Main; 44°44′47″N 72°10′38″W	Barton	
3	Crystal Lake State Park	Crystal Lake State Park	August 30, 2005 (#05000949)	96 Bellwater Ave. 44°44′59″N 72°10′10″W	Barton	
4	Derby House Hotel	Derby House Hotel	September 3, 1998 (#98001150)	Junction of VT 105 (Main St.) and West St. 44°56′52″N 72°08′04″W	Derby	
5	Jerry E. Dickerman House	Jerry E. Dickerman House	July 11, 2001 (#01000732)	36 Field Ave. 44°56′10″N 72°12′38″W	Newport	
6	District Number Four School	District Number Four School	August 2, 2001 (#01000825)	116 N. Craftsbury Rd. 44°38′16″N 72°22′31″W	Craftsbury	
7	Fox Hall	Fox Hall	September 27, 1984 (#84003468)	Fox Hall Ln., off Peene Hill Rd. 44°46′24″N 72°04′24″W	Westmore	
8	Goodrich Memorial Library	Goodrich Memorial Library	November 23, 1983 (#83004228)	Main and Field St. 44°56′09″N 72°12′37″W	Newport	
9	Greensboro Depot	Greensboro Depot	April 21, 1975 (#75000144)	Western side of Main St. at railroad crossing 44°32′47″N 72°15′53″W	Greensboro Bend	
10	Haskell Free Library and Opera House	Haskell Free Library and Opera House	September 8, 1976 (#76000143)	Caswell Ave. 45°00′22″N 72°05′55″W	Derby Line	
11	William Hayden House	William Hayden House	January 31, 1978 (#78000238)	South of Albany on VT 14; 44°42′36″N 72°23′26″W	Albany	
12	Holland Congregational Church		December 4, 1986 (#86003411)	W. Holland Rd. 44°58′09″N 72°02′14″W	Holland	
13	House at 68 Highland Avenue	House at 68 Highland Avenue	July 20, 2000 (#00000831)	68 Highland Ave. 44°55′57″N 72°13′18″W	Newport	
14	Irasburg Town Hall	Irasburg Town Hall	November 21, 1994 (#94001334)	Junction of VT 14 and VT 58, east of Creek Rd. 44°48′09″N 72°16′43″W	Irasburg	
15	L. P. Jenne Block	L. P. Jenne Block	September 3, 1998 (#98001151)	Junction of VT 105 (Main St.) and West St. 44°56′50″N 72°08′04″W	Derby	
16	King Block	King Block	June 20, 2002 (#02000663)	117 High St. 44°44′58″N 72°10′37″W	Barton	
17	Lakeview Inn	Lakeview Inn	February 4, 2000 (#00000062)	295 Breezy Ave. 44°34′18″N 72°17′55″W	Greensboro	
18	Newport Downtown Historic District	Newport Downtown Historic District	September 28, 2006 (#06000898)	Main, Coventry, Central, 2nd, Summer, 3rd, School, Bayview, Eastern, Field, Seymour, and Fyfe; 44°56′15″N 72°12′35″W	Newport	
19	Orleans County Courthouse and Jail Complex	Orleans County Courthouse and Jail Complex	November 23, 1984 (#84000336)	Main St. 44°56′06″N 72°12′39″W	Newport	
20	Orne Covered Bridge	Orne Covered Bridge	November 20, 1974 (#74000328)	Back Coventry Rd., over the Black River; 44°51′38″N 72°16′28″W	Irasburg	
21	River Road Covered Bridge	River Road Covered Bridge	November 19, 1974 (#74000249)	South of North Troy off VT 101, over the Missisquoi River; 44°57′21″N 72°23′39″W	North Troy	
22	Sacred Heart School		August 25, 2026 (#100013283)	47 Clermont Terrace; 44°55′51″N 72°12′59″W	Newport	
23	John Woodruff Simpson Memorial Library		December 11, 2025 (#100012409)	1972 East Craftsbury Road; 44°38′24″N 72°20′17″W	Craftsbury	
24	J. S. Sweeney Store, Barn, Livery and Hall	J. S. Sweeney Store, Barn, Livery and Hall	August 18, 1992 (#92000993)	Junction of VT 105 and Town Highway 3 (Main St.); 44°50′16″N 71°59′24″W	Charleston	
25	U.S. Courthouse, Post Office and Customs House	U.S. Courthouse, Post Office and Customs House	December 12, 1976 (#76000144)	217 Main St. 44°56′07″N 72°12′37″W	Newport	
26	U.S. Inspection Station-Beebe Plain, Vermont	U.S. Inspection Station-Beebe Plain, Vermont	September 10, 2014 (#14000608)	3136 Beebe Rd. 45°00′20″N 72°08′30″W	Derby	
27	U.S. Inspection Station-Derby Line, Vermont	U.S. Inspection Station-Derby Line, Vermont	September 10, 2014 (#14000609)	84 Main St. 45°00′17″N 72°06′01″W	Derby	
28	U.S. Inspection Station-North Troy, Vermont	U.S. Inspection Station-North Troy, Vermont	September 10, 2014 (#14000610)	743 VT 243; 45°00′21″N 72°24′54″W	Troy	
29	Ai J. White Duplex	Ai J. White Duplex	August 4, 2011 (#11000516)	343 Main St. 44°56′04″N 72°12′46″W	Newport	

== See also ==
- List of National Historic Landmarks in Vermont
- National Register of Historic Places listings in Vermont
