= List of United States federal courthouses in Vermont =

Following is a list of current and former courthouses of the United States federal court system located in Vermont. Each entry indicates the name of the building along with an image, if available, its location and the jurisdiction it covers, the dates during which it was used for each such jurisdiction, and, if applicable the person for whom it was named, and the date of renaming. Dates of use will not necessarily correspond with the dates of construction or demolition of a building, as pre-existing structures may be adapted or court use, and former court buildings may later be put to other uses. Also, the official name of the building may be changed at some point after its use as a federal court building has been initiated.

== Courthouses ==
Courthouse	City	Image	Street address	Jurisdiction	Dates of use	Named for
U.S. Post Office and Court House	Brattleboro		204 Main Street	D. Vt.	1917–2017; Still in use as a post office.	n/a
U.S. Post Office and Courthouse	Burlington		180 Church Street	D. Vt.	1870–? Later used as the county courthouse; destroyed by fire in 1982.	n/a
U.S. Post Office and Custom House†	Burlington		175 Main Street	D. Vt.	? Now the Chittenden County Superior Courthouse.	n/a
Federal Building, Post Office and Courthouse	Burlington		11 Elmwood Avenue	D. Vt.	1958–present	n/a
U.S. Post Office and Courthouse	Montpelier		87 State St	D. Vt.	1894–1948 razed ca. 1963	n/a
Federal Building, U.S. Post Office and Courthouse	Montpelier		87 State Street	D. Vt.	1964–1996; Still in use as a post office.	n/a
U.S. Courthouse, Post Office, and Custom House^{†}	Newport		217 Main Street	D. Vt.	1904–1948; Now the Orleans County District Court.	n/a
U.S. Court House and Post Office	Rutland		10 Court Street	D. Vt.	1859–1933; Now the Rutland Free Library.	n/a
U.S. Post Office and Courthouse	Rutland		151 West Street	D. Vt.	1933–present	n/a
U.S. Courthouse and Post Office	Windsor		57 Main St.	D. Vt.	1858–1976; Still in use as a post office.	n/a

== Key ==
^{†}	Listed on the National Register of Historic Places (NRHP)
^{††}	NRHP-listed and also designated as a National Historic Landmark
