= J. S. Sweeney Store, Barn, Livery and Hall =

- U.S. National Register of Historic Places
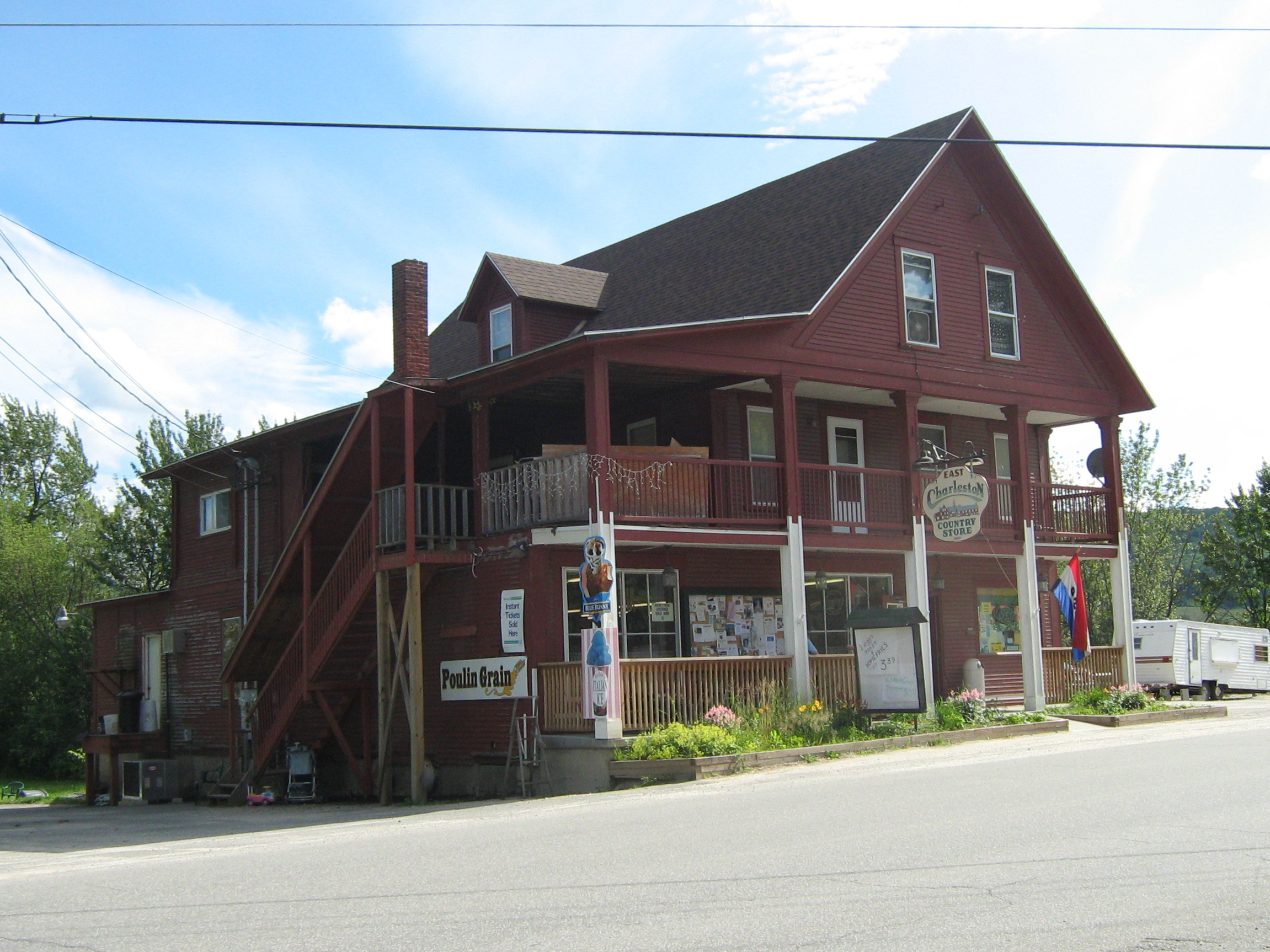
- The store

- Location within Vermont Location within the United States
- Location: Jct. of VT 105 and Town Hwy. 3 (Main St.), Charleston, Vermont
- Coordinates: 44°50′16″N 71°59′24″W
- Area: 1.5 acres (0.61 ha)
- Built: 1860
- Architectural style: Greek Revival
- NRHP reference No.: 92000993
- Added to NRHP: August 18, 1992

The J.S. Sweeney Store, Barn, Livery and Hall were a trio of historically important commercial buildings on Vermont Route 105 in East Charleston, Vermont. Dating as far back as 1860, the general store, bank barn, and combination livery and community hall have been a center of community activity since their construction. They were listed on the National Register of Historic Places in 1992. Of the three buildings, only the store is still standing.

== Description and history ==
The J.S. Sweeney Store is located prominently in the center of the village of East Charleston, on the south side of Vermont 105 opposite the village's other principal public building, the Plymouth Congregational Church. It is a 2 1/2-story wood-frame structure, with a front gable roof and clapboarded exterior. The front facade has a wider first floor than second, with a two-story recessed porch extending across its width, supported by square paneled posts with Doric capitals. The porch continues over the left-side extension of the ground floor, where it is sheltered by a shed-roof extension of the main roof. The interior is divided into a retail space on the ground floor, and residences above.

The village of East Charleston was founded on the banks of the Clyde River in 1820, and grew as a small lumber town. Most of the village's 19th-century buildings were destroyed by a fire in 1921, of which only the church and the store now survive. The present store was built about 1880, and is of a style typical for northern Vermont general stores: two stories with the proprietor's residence above the shop, a two-story porch, and modest Greek Revival styling. Other buildings that survived the fire included a c. 1860 bank barn and livery stable, the latter of which had a community hall on the second level. The livery served as a major stop on a stagecoach route, and the hall is documented to have been used for community events and meetings. These buildings were located west of the store; although they survived the 1921 fire, they were demolished sometime after the property was listed on the National Register in 1992.

== See also ==
- National Register of Historic Places listings in Orleans County, Vermont
