= Newport Downtown Historic District (Newport, Vermont) =

Historic district in Vermont, United States

- U.S. National Register of Historic Places
- U.S. Historic district
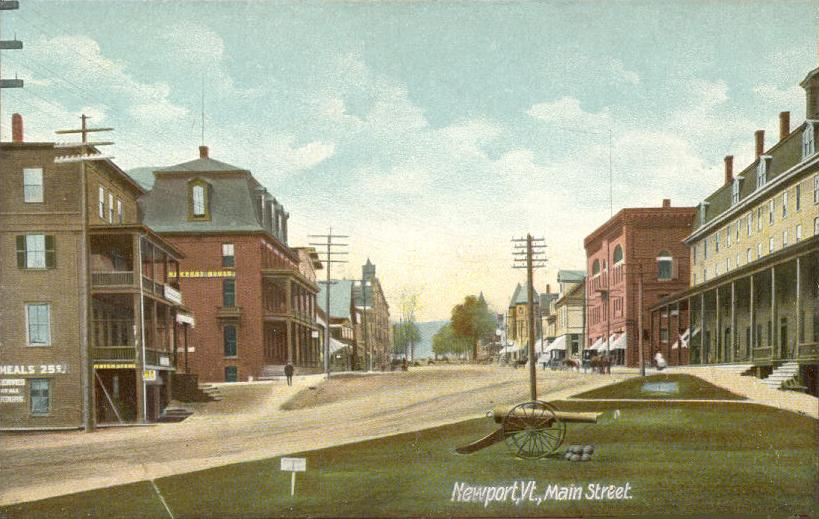
- Downtown Newport, 1908 postcard view

- Location within Vermont Location within the United States
- Location: Main, Coventry, Central, Second, Summer, Third, School, Bayview, Eastern, Field, Seymour, Fyfe, Newport, Vermont
- Coordinates: 44°56′15″N 72°12′35″W
- Area: 37 acres (15 ha)
- Architect: Packard, Lambert; et.al.
- Architectural style: Greek Revival, Italianate
- NRHP reference No.: 06000898
- Added to NRHP: September 28, 2006

The Newport Downtown Historic District encompasses most of the historic downtown area of the city of Newport, Vermont. The city developed as a transit hub and tourist area in the second half of the 19th century, spurred by the construction of a railroad to the area. The district, roughly bounded by Third Street, Coventry Street, and Lake Memphremagog, was listed on the National Register of Historic Places in 2006.

== Description and history ==
The town of Newport, located at the southern end of Lake Memphremagog, was a sleepy agricultural area until 1863, when the Passumpsic Railroad began service. The area then boomed, its economy raised by increases in lumbering and tourism on the lake. In 1918, the central village of the town of Newport was united with the adjacent village of West Derby to form the city of Newport.

The city's main downtown area remains that of the original village, set on a small peninsula jutting eastward into the southernmost finger of the lake. This peninsula was a marshy wilderness until 1820, when it was cleared of timber. A bridge was built from the peninsula to the eastern shore of the lake in 1832, carrying the main road from Derby to Burlington. After the railroad was built through the area in 1863, the stage route became the main downtown area, with hotels, and civic and commercial services. Its regional importance was cemented in the 1880s, when it became the county seat of Orleans County, and the Orleans County Courthouse and Jail Complex was built.

The historic district encompasses most of the eastern end of the peninsula housing the city's main business district. The cluster of civic buildings includes, in addition to the courthouse complex, the Federal courthouse, post office and customs house building, the former National Guard armory that now serves as city hall, and the Goodrich Memorial Library, a fine example of Romanesque architecture. There are three churches in the district. Residential architecture in the district often includes broad covered porches, and architectural details of the Victorian and Colonial Revival periods.

== See also ==
- National Register of Historic Places listings in Orleans County, Vermont
