= L. P. Jenne Block =

- L.P. Jenne Block
- U.S. National Register of Historic Places
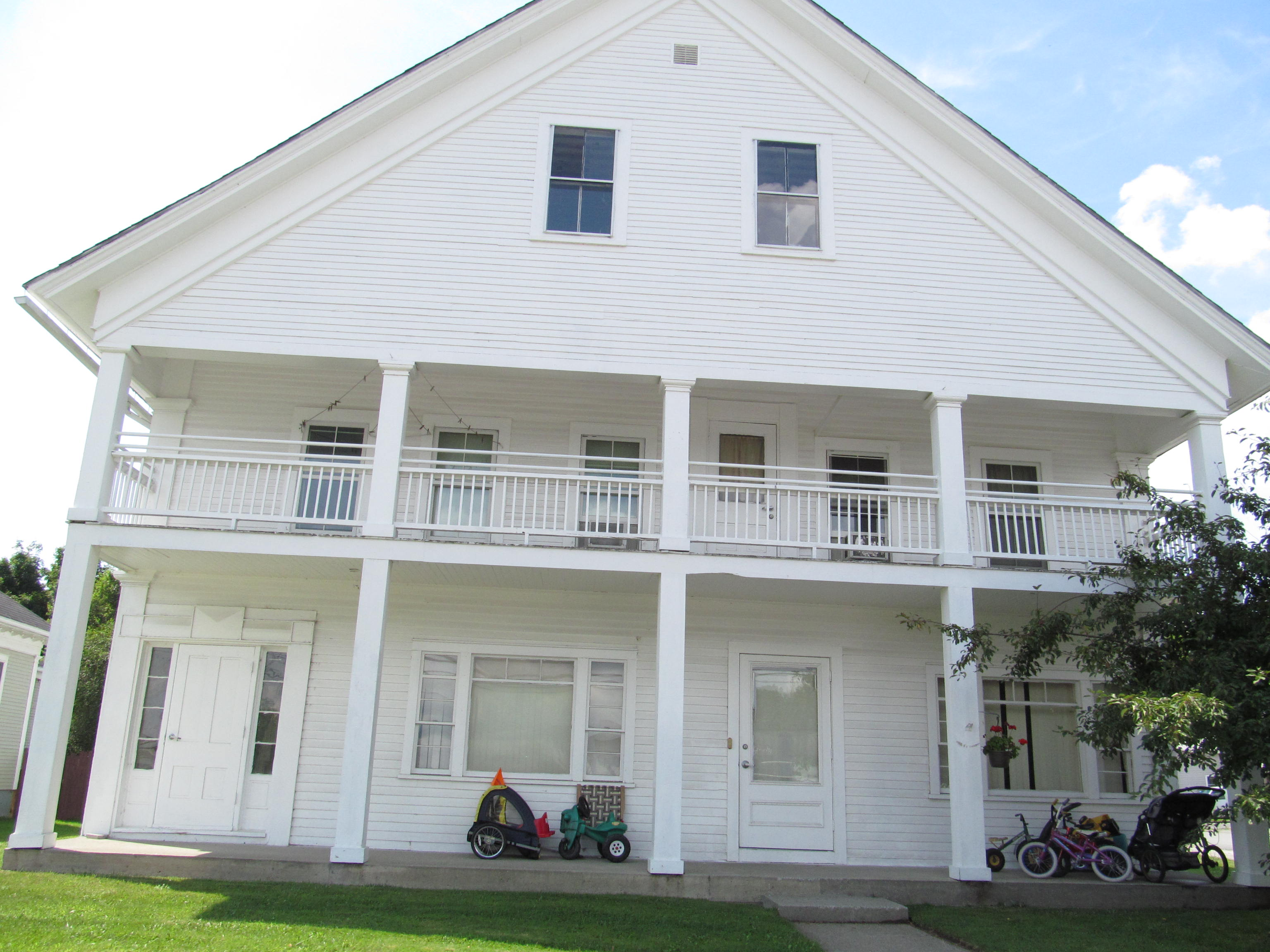

- Location within Vermont Location within the United States
- Location: Jct. of VT 105 (Main St.) and West St., Derby, Vermont
- Coordinates: 44°56′50″N 72°8′4″W
- Area: less than one acre
- Built: 1870
- Architectural style: Greek Revival
- NRHP reference No.: 98001151
- Added to NRHP: September 3, 1998

The L.P. Jenne Block is a historic commercial-residential building at the junction of Vermont Route 105 and West Street in the village of Derby Center in Derby, Vermont, United States. Built about 1870, it is a well-preserved example of a late-19th century general store. Now completely converted into residential use, it was listed on the National Register of Historic Places in 1998.

== Description and history ==
The L.P. Jenne Block stands in the village of Derby Center, at the southwest corner of Main Street (Vermont Route 105) and West Street. It is a 2 1/2-story wood-frame structure, with a gabled roof and clapboarded exterior. The most prominent feature of the building is its recessed two-story porch, which is supported by square posts. It is open on the ground floor, and has a simple yet multi-raied balustrade on the second floor. The ground floor is divided into two parts, each having a three-part picture window on the right and an entrance on the left. The leftmost entrance is particularly elaborate, with sidelight windows, pilasters, and a multi-paneled header. The original main block of the building is extended by a two-story ell with a slightly lower roof pierced by broad shed-roof dormers.

The block was built about 1870, on a site that has seen retail activity since the late 18th century. It was probably built by its first proprietors, Parker and Robbins, but is best known for a long-time owner, Lucien P. Jenne, who ran the general store on the ground floor between 1882 and 1913. The building is structurally similar to other surviving general stores of the period in northern Vermont, with living space for the proprietor above the shop, and a vernacular Greek Revival exterior with two-story porch. It was converted entirely into apartments in 1945.

== See also ==
- National Register of Historic Places listings in Orleans County, Vermont
