= Crystal Lake Falls Historic District =

Historic district in Vermont, United States

- U.S. National Register of Historic Places
- U.S. Historic district
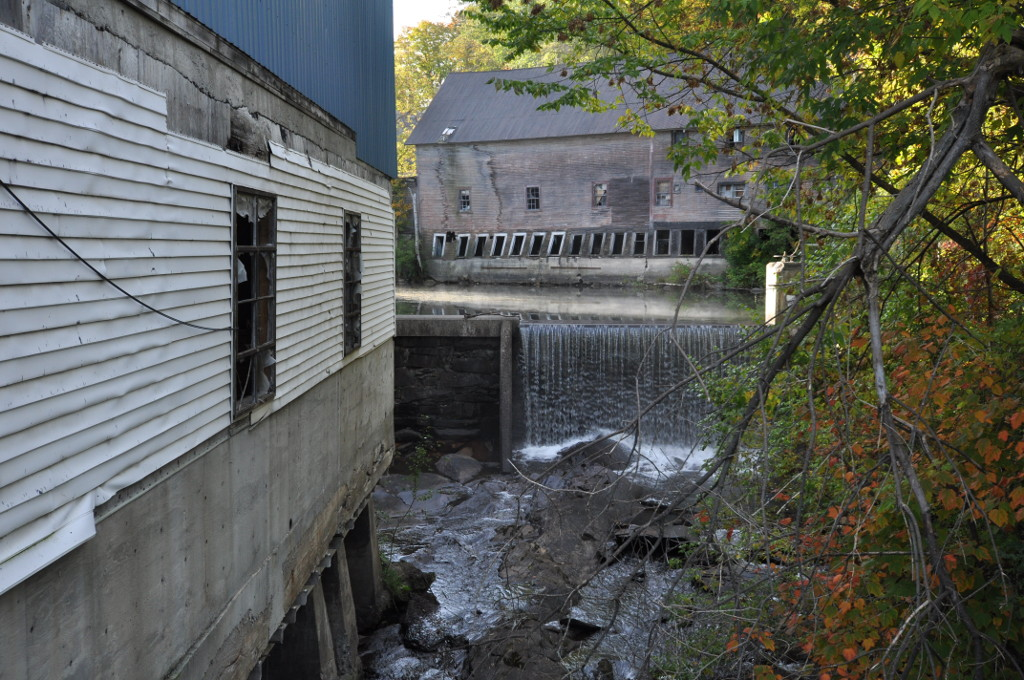
- Part of Barton's industrial heritage

- Location within Vermont Location within the United States
- Location: Roughly, Water St. from Church St. to Main St., Main from Water to Duck Pond Rd. and West St. from Cemetery Rd. to Main; Barton, Vermont
- Coordinates: 44°44′48.6″N 72°10′32.8″W
- Area: 12 acres (4.9 ha)
- NRHP reference No.: 94000699
- Added to NRHP: August 7, 1994

The Crystal Lake Falls Historic District, also known as the Brick Kingdom, is a historic industrial and residential area in Barton, Vermont, United States. It is located along Water Street and Main Street, roughly paralleling Willoughby Brook, whose waters powered the area's industries. It was added to the U.S. National Register of Historic Places on August 7, 1994.

== The Brick Kingdom ==
The Crystal Lake Falls Historic District covers several blocks of Barton village, located at northwest corner of Crystal Lake. It extends roughly along Water Street from Church to Main Street, along Main from Water to Duck Pond Road, and along West Street from Cemetery Road to Main Street. The latter areas is known colloquially as the "Brick Kingdom", and runs roughly parallel to Willoughby Brook, the outflow from Crystal Lake, which drops about 90 feet (27 m) in a series of falls. The earliest documented industrial activity on the falls began in the 1790s, with Asa Kimball starting a sawmill in 1798 and a gristmill in 1807 on the upper falls. During the 19th century, factories clustered along Water Street, with a variety of manufacturing activities. Businesses located here manufactured piano works, furniture, ladies cotton lingerie and baseball bats. These mostly closed by the 1940s, with the last leaving in 1952. The mills employed about 300 workers.

Mills and other local industrial activities included the following:

- Heyward Chair Company 1860–1890
- Charles Ufford Carriage Maker 1868 – circa 1892
- Barton Woolen Mill (carding wool, buying and selling wool) 1875–1926. One of the last carding mills in the country.
- J.W. Murkland – manufactured machinery, operated a foundry, produced plows, bobbin and spool machinery, etc. 1876–1941
- Peerless Manufacturing Company 1892–1924. employed 100 women and a few men to produce ladies and children's underwear.
- Barton Wood Heel and Lumber Company. Using the Peerless plant, 1924–1938.
- Butter tub factory 1893–1916. Employed up to 60 men. A 1916 fire put these men out of work and had a considerable effect on the community, when these unemployed people moved out with their families. Many were Catholic and their departure had a particularly detrimental effect on the local church for many years.
- Percival Manufacturing Company 1889–1905
- Pillsbury and Baldwin Company 1906–1911. Manufactured toilet tanks and seats. Employed up to 40 men
- Wessell, Nickel and Gross 1919–1941. Manufactured piano actions. Employed up to 42 men.
- Barton Wood Products Company 1943. Used former Wessel, Nickel and Gross plant. Employed 50. Burned on New Year's Eve.
- Progressive Furniture Company 1944–1952.Repaired Barton Wood Products building. Manufactured wooden chairs. 1944–1952. Employed 30 people.
- Table factory circa 1903–1933. Made tables and bookcases.
- Tower brothers. Grist mill. circa 1880 – circa 1906
- Barron Wedgewood Horseshoe 1908–1920. Manufactured a specialized horseshoe that would prevent snow buildup.
- Commercial Ice Harvesting 1870–1947+
- Granite Quarries 1888 – circa 1935

== See also ==
- National Register of Historic Places listings in Orleans County, Vermont
