= Derby House Hotel =

- U.S. National Register of Historic Places
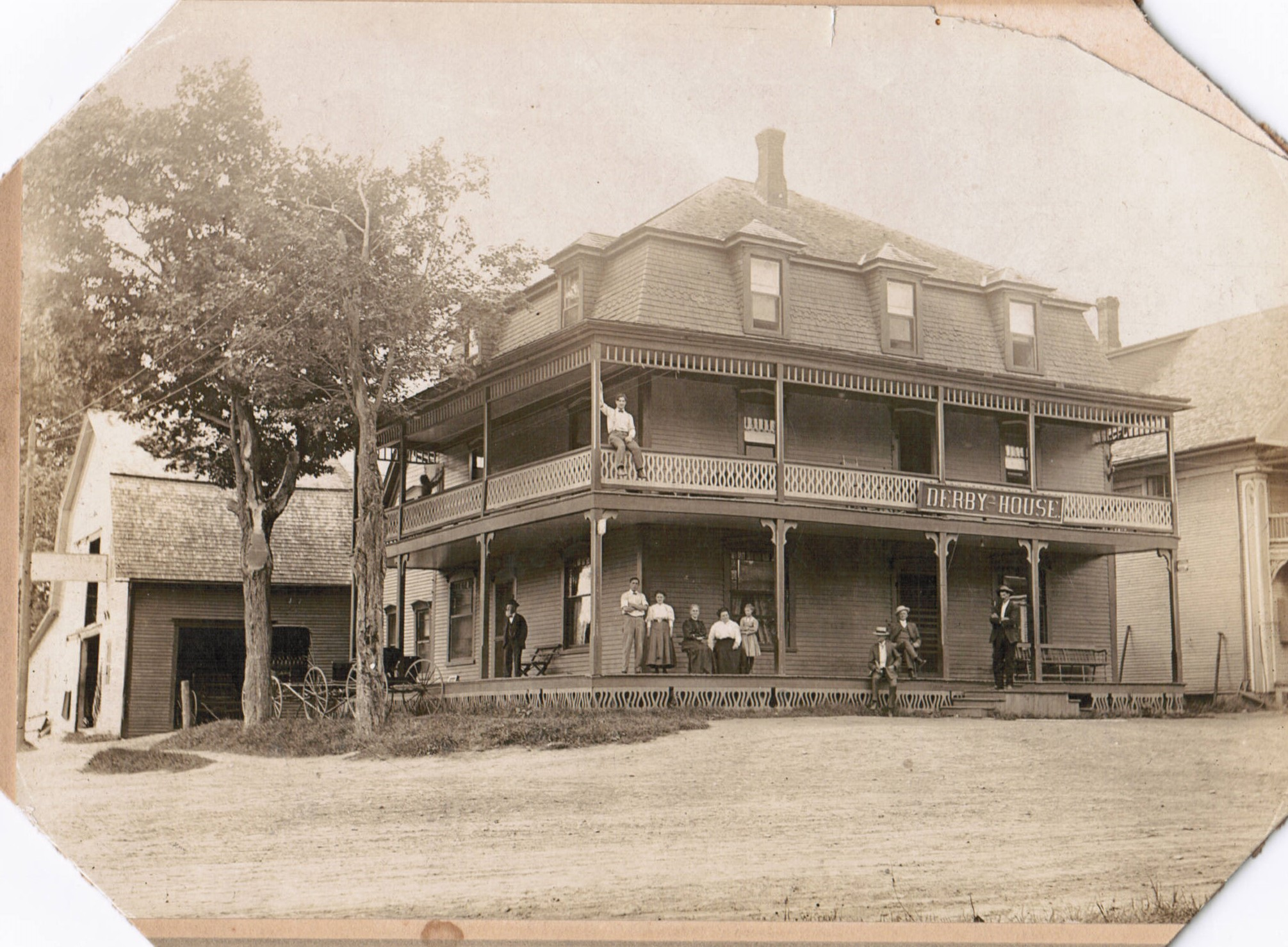

- Location within Vermont Location within the United States
- Location: Jct. of VT 105 (Main St.) and West St., Derby, Vermont
- Coordinates: 44°56′52″N 72°8′4″W
- Area: less than one acre
- Built: 1896
- Architectural style: Second Empire
- NRHP reference No.: 98001150
- Added to NRHP: September 3, 1998

The Derby House Hotel is a historic former hotel building at Main and West Streets in Derby, Vermont. Erected in 1896, it was for many years an important element of the social and commercial life of the small community. Now converted into apartments, it was listed on the National Register of Historic Places in 1998.

== Description and history ==
The former Derby House Hotel stands in the village of Derby Center, at the northwest corner of Main Street (Vermont Route 105) and West Street. It is a 2 1/2-story wood-frame structure, with a dormered mansard roof providing space for a full third floor. The main facade is three bays wide, with windows set in surrounds with slightly gabled lintels. The most prominent feature of the building is its two-story porch, which is a near replica of the original, as seen in an early 20th-century photograph. The ground floor porch is open, with square posts that lack bracketing found in the original. A short skirt of angled slats runs around the base. The second-floor porch balustrade has elements in a figure-eight pattern, and there is a spindled valance above. The porch wraps around to the side facing West Street. An ell extends to the rear (west) of the main block.

The hotel was built in 1896 by L.A. Rickard, to meet a demand that was primarily for visitors conducting business in the local industries. This is different than many other 19th-century Vermont hotels, which were built for the tourist trade. This hotel had some of the same trappings as tourist hotels, most notably the porch, which was a common feature on Vermont hotels of the time, and is the only one to survive in the northeastern part of the state. Its business was always somewhat precarious, and it ceased to serve as a hotel after foreclosure in 1932. It was converted into apartments in 1946.

== See also ==
- National Register of Historic Places listings in Orleans County, Vermont
