= Orne Covered Bridge =

- U.S. National Register of Historic Places
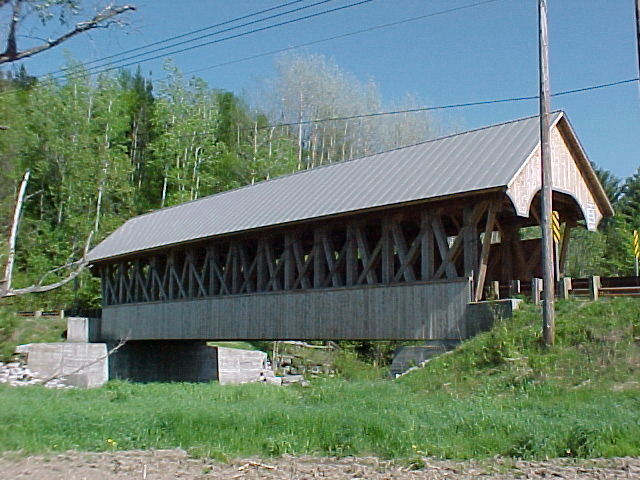

- Location within Vermont Location within the United States
- Location: Back Coventry Rd. s of Coventry village, Irasburg, Vermont
- Coordinates: 44°51′38″N 72°16′28″W
- Area: 1 acre (0.40 ha)
- Architectural style: Paddleford truss
- NRHP reference No.: 74000328
- Added to NRHP: November 20, 1974

The Orne Covered Bridge is a replica of a historic bridge on Back Coventry Road in Irasburg, Vermont. Built in 2000, it is a replacement for a 19th-century bridge which stood on the site until it was destroyed by arson in 1997. The historic bridge was listed on the National Register of Historic Places in 1974.

== Description and history ==
The Orne Covered Bridge stands in far northern Irasburg, just south of the main village of Coventry, on Back Coventry Road. It is a single-span Paddleford truss structure, oriented in a roughly east–west direction across the Black River. It is 87 feet (27 m) long and 17 feet (5.2 m) wide, with a roadway width of 14 feet (4.3 m) (one lane). It has a gabled metal roof, and is clad in vertical board siding, which extends around to the insides of the portals. The siding on the portal ends extends outward to meet the ends of the gables, which extend 3 feet (0.91 m) beyond the sides. The deck consists of wooden planking.

The exact date of construction of the historic bridge is uncertain, as is its builder. Different sources claim construction dates of 1879 and 1881, and the builder as either E.P. Colton or John Colton. At the time of its listing on the National Register of Historic Places in 1974, it had had no substantive alterations, notably not having had strengthening elements added. It was also the only surviving historic Paddleford truss bridge on a public roadway in the state. It was destroyed by an arsonist in 1997; the present bridge was completed in 2000.

== See also ==
- List of covered bridges in Vermont
- National Register of Historic Places listings in Orleans County, Vermont
- List of bridges on the National Register of Historic Places in Vermont
