= River Road Covered Bridge =

- U.S. National Register of Historic Places
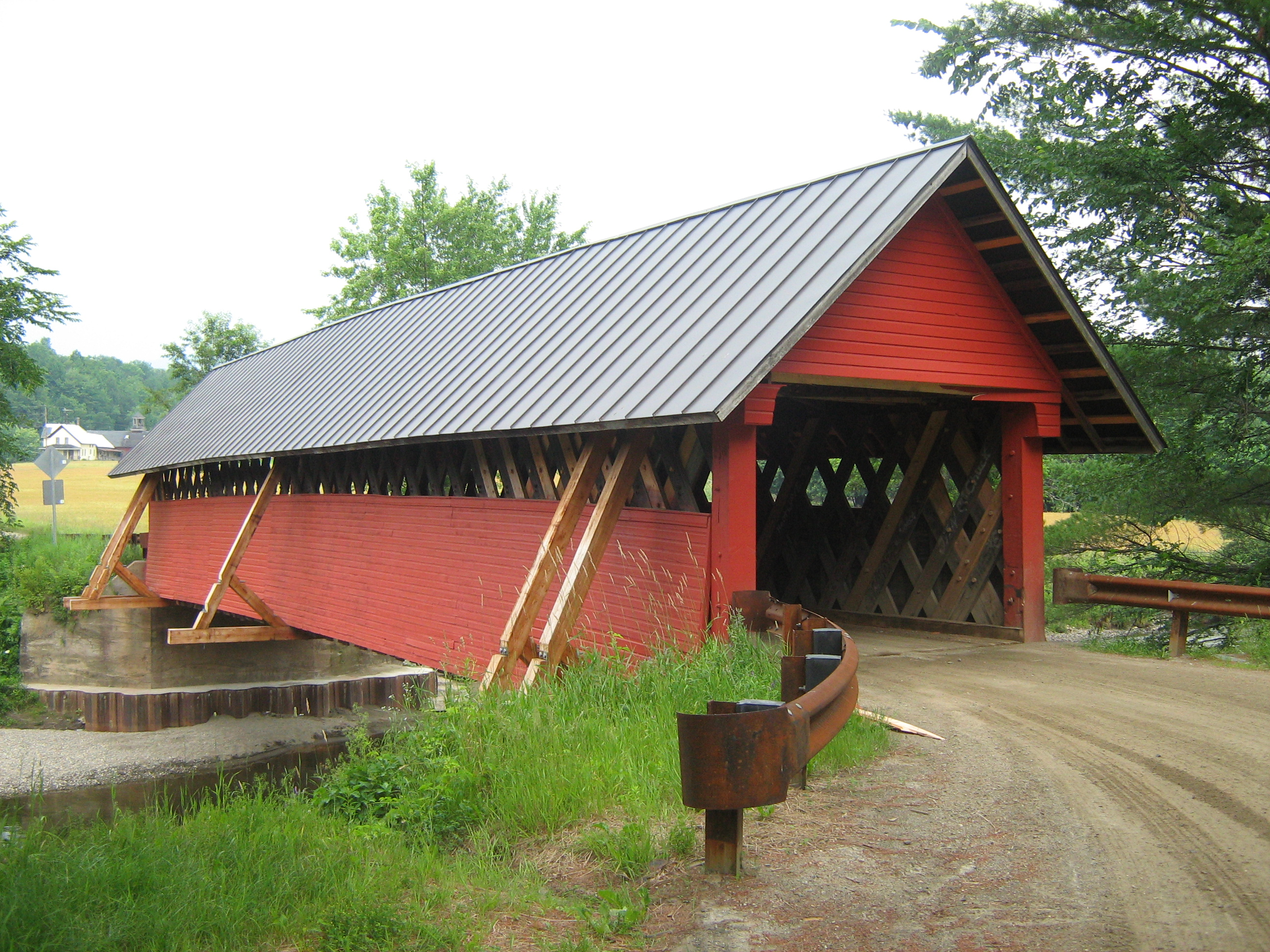

- Location within Vermont Location within the United States
- Location: Veilleux Rd., Troy, Vermont
- Coordinates: 44°57′21″N 72°23′39″W
- Area: 1 acre (0.40 ha)
- Architectural style: Town lattice truss
- NRHP reference No.: 74000249
- Added to NRHP: November 19, 1974

The River Road Covered Bridge was a historic covered bridge, carrying Veilleux Road across the Missisquoi River in Troy, Vermont. Built in 1910, the Town lattice truss was the only surviving covered bridge in Troy from the historic period of covered bridge construction when it burned on February 6, 2021. It also exhibited some distinctive variations in construction from more typical Town lattices. It was listed on the National Register of Historic Places in 1974.

== Description and history ==
The River Road Covered Bridge was located in a rural area of central Troy, near the eastern end of Veilleux Road. It spanned the Missisquoi in a roughly east–west orientation, resting on abutments of stone and concrete. It was a single-span Town lattice truss, 94 feet (29 m) long and 14.5 feet (4.4 m) wide, with a roadway width of 12 feet (3.7 m) (one lane). It was covered by a metal roof, and its exterior was clad in vertical board siding, which extended around to the insides of the portals. The siding did not rise all the way to the roof, leaving an open strip between them. Unlike most Town lattice trusses, this one had three chords instead of four, and its joints were fastened with single pegs instead of doubled one.

The bridge was built in 1910; its builder is unknown. It was the only covered bridge in Troy. In addition to its unusual truss construction, the bridge also had an unusually broad roof, and had exterior timber buttressing not usually found on covered bridges.

== See also ==
- List of covered bridges in Vermont
- National Register of Historic Places listings in Orleans County, Vermont
- List of bridges on the National Register of Historic Places in Vermont
