= Columbia Forest Products =

U.S. hardwood product manufacturer

- Company type: Private/employee-owned
- Industry: Forest Products
- Founded: 1957
- Headquarters: Greensboro, North Carolina, United States
- Key people: Greg Pray (CEO)
- Number of employees: 2,000
- Website: www.columbiaforestproducts.com

Columbia Forest Products is the largest manufacturer of hardwood veneer and hardwood plywood in the United States. Founded in 1957, it is headquartered in Greensboro, North Carolina. It specializes in decorative, interior veneers and plywood panels that are used in high-end cabinetry, fine furniture, architectural millwork and commercial fixtures. The company distributes its products primarily through a network of wholesale distributors, mass merchandisers and OEMs. Since 1976, the company has been completely employee-owned and currently has 10 manufacturing facilities throughout the U.S. and Canada. At the end of 2006, Columbia converted all of its standard hardwood plywood production to produce formaldehyde-free panels called PureBond. In 2007 Columbia added PureBond formaldehyde-free particleboard to its product range.

== History ==
The company began in 1957 in Klamath Falls, Oregon, as Klamath Hardwoods, establishing its first hardwood veneer plant with 43 employees. In 1963, it was acquired by Columbia Plywood Corp. In 1966, it acquired additional facilities in Presque Isle, Maine, and Newport, Vermont.

The company was restructured by an employee buy-out in 1976, acquiring its current name. In 1982, it built a manufacturing facility in Old Fort, North Carolina. In 1986, it acquired two additional plants in Chatham, Virginia, and Trumann, Arkansas.

In 1989, it acquired the Laminated Products Division in Thomasville, North Carolina, as well as a hardwood veneer face manufacturing mill in Rutherglen, Ontario. In 1991, it acquired a half-round slicing operation in New Freedom, Pennsylvania. In March 1996, it acquired two hardwood plywood plants in Danville, Virginia, and DeQueen, Arkansas. In August 1996, it acquired two plants in Hearst, Ontario (Plywood, PBC & Melamines), and St-Casimir, Quebec. In December 1996, the Laminated Products Division became Columbia Flooring. In January 1997, it acquired an additional hardwood plywood plant in Cuthbert, Georgia. In 2000 CFP acquired an existing veneer plant in Mellen Wisconsin. And a few years after, a massive overhaul in the plant took place, and an in-line dryer system was installed to streamline production and ensure the plant stayed competitive and profitable.

In June 2007 Mohawk Industries bought four factories from Columbia Forest Products: two pre-finished solid plants and one engineered wood plant in the U.S., and an engineered wood plant in Malaysia.

Columbia Forest Products relocated its headquarters at the end of 2007 to Greensboro, North Carolina, from Portland, Oregon.
