= King Block (Barton, Vermont) =

- U.S. National Register of Historic Places
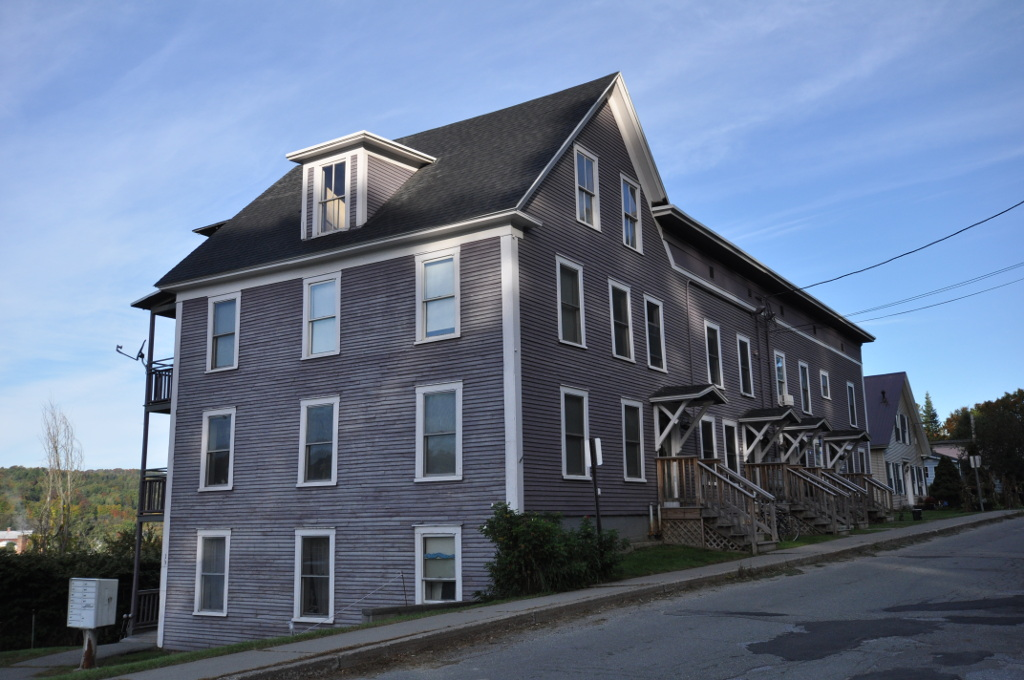

- Location within Vermont Location within the United States
- Location: 117 High St., Barton, Vermont
- Coordinates: 44°44′58″N 72°10′37″W
- Area: less than one acre
- Built: 1921
- Architectural style: tenement
- NRHP reference No.: 02000663
- Added to NRHP: June 20, 2002

The King Block is a historic apartment house at 117 High Street, Barton, Vermont, United States. It was added to the U.S. National Register of Historic Places on July 20, 2002. Built in 1870 and expanded several times, it is a well-preserved example of tenement-style worker housing of the late 19th century.

== Description and history ==
The King Block is located just outside the downtown area of Barton, on the west side of High Street north of Eastern Avenue. It is a three-story wood frame building composed of several structures which were joined together. The oldest portion dates to 1870, and started out as an Italianate single-family house. By the 1890s it was being used by multiple families with shared entries but separate living units. Further changes, completed by 1921, brought the building to its present shape. It presents a twelve-bay facade to the street, with four separate entrances, each sheltered by a gabled hood. Due to the sloping nature of the lot, the south and west sides present the basement level as well. The south-facing side facade is three bays wide, with a cross-gabled roof above that is pierced by a single shed-roof dormer. The west facade, overlooking a railroad right-of-way, is adorned with porches on each level.

The building has had a number of owners through its period of alteration between 1870 and 1921. Its owner in the late 1910s and 1920s was James C. King, a local real estate agent, and it was in the 1920s that it became known as the "King Block". The historic modifications to the building reflect the periods of expansion of Barton's milling and manufacturing industries. The building exhibits typical design features of large tenements built in the state in the late 19th and early 20th centuries such as the multiple entry doors on the front façade and multi-level Colonial Revival style rear porch.

== See also ==
- National Register of Historic Places listings in Orleans County, Vermont
