= Lakeview Inn =

- U.S. National Register of Historic Places
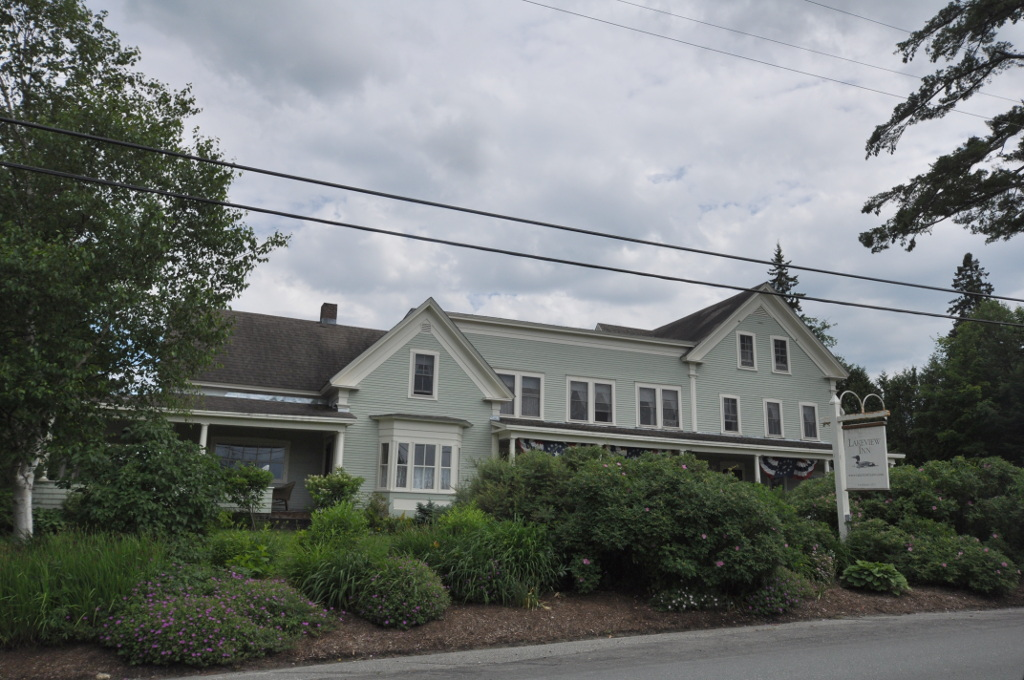

- Location within Vermont Location within the United States
- Location: 295 Breezy Ave., Greensboro, Vermont
- Coordinates: 44°34′18″N 72°17′55″W
- Area: 1.9 acres (0.77 ha)
- Built: 1872
- NRHP reference No.: 00000062
- Added to NRHP: February 4, 2000

The Lakeview Inn is a historic tourist accommodation at 295 Breezy Avenue in Greensboro, Vermont. Built in 1872 and enlarged several times, the inn illustrates the evolutionary changes in tourism of northern Vermont. It was listed on the National Register of Historic Places in 2000.

== Description and history ==
The Lakeview Inn is located in the southern part of the village of Greensboro, on the east side of Breezy Avenue overlooking the southern end of Caspian Lake. It is a rambling wood-frame structure, with a 2 1/2-story main block extended to the side and rear by 1 1/2-story sections, giving it an overall L shape. Its oldest section is near the northern end; it also presents a gable to the street, and has a single-story polygonal bay window in the first floor and pilastered corners. Shed-roof porches extend to either side of this section, covering the full width of the building. The interior reflects fifty years of evolutionary history, including some finish elements from virtually every major period of alteration.

The Lakeview Inn began in 1872 as a modest 1 1/2-story Italianate boarding house, catering to summer visitors enjoying the local scenery. In 1880 a summer colony of academics and artists was established at Caspian Lake, and the inn served as one of its major meeting points. It underwent several phases of enlargement, with the last significant actions being the unification of the facade in 1921 by the construction of the Colonial Revival porch across the front. It closed as a tourist venue in 1977, but was later reopened as a bed and breakfast accommodation.

== See also ==
- National Register of Historic Places listings in Orleans County, Vermont
