= Foxhall =

Foxhall may refer to:

- Foxhall, County Donegal, Ireland
- Foxhall (horse) (1878-1904), an American-bred thoroughbred racehorse and sire
- Foxhall, Pembrokeshire, Wales
- Foxhall, Suffolk, a civil parish in the East Suffolk district of Suffolk, England, UK
- Foxhall (Washington, D.C.), a neighborhood of Washington, D.C., U.S.
- Lin Foxhall (born 1961), British archaeologist
- Foxhall Stadium British motor racing stadium

== See also ==
- Fox Hall, a disambiguation
