= Holland Congregational Church =

Historic church in Vermont, United States

- U.S. National Register of Historic Places
- Location within Vermont Location within the United States
- Location: Gore Rd., Holland, Vermont
- Coordinates: 44°58′9″N 72°2′14″W
- Area: 0.6 acres (0.24 ha)
- Built: 1844
- Architect: Hall, William; Ferrin, Martin
- Architectural style: Greek Revival
- NRHP reference No.: 86003411
- Added to NRHP: December 04, 1986

The Holland Congregational Church (West Holland Church) is a historic church on Gore Road in Holland, Vermont. Built in 1844, it is a prominent local example of Greek Revival architecture, and is the town's only surviving 19th-century public building. It was listed on the National Register of Historic Places in 1986.

== Description and history ==
The Holland Congregational Church stands in an isolated rural setting, on the east side of Gore Road between its junctions with Bullis Road and Stagecoach Lane. It is a single-story wood-frame structure, with a gabled roof, clapboarded exterior, and stone foundation. A square tower rises from near the front of the roof ridge, with a low first stage, taller second stage with pilastered corners, and a third belfry stage with louvered openings and pilastered corners. It is capped by a pyramidal roof with spire. The main facade is symmetrical, with sash windows in the outer bays (including a pair at the gallery level), and a center entrance, framed by pilasters and a corniced entablature. The interior has a small vestibule area, providing access to the main sanctuary, a narrow winding stair to the gallery above, and a small kitchen with c. 1880 fixtures. The sanctuary retains its original carved pulpit and minister's chair, and has a band of tulip stencilwork bordering the tops of the walls.

Construction on the church began in 1844, when its frame was erected. It was not completed, however, until ten years later. It housed an active congregation until 1954. Despite declining population in the town, there was strong public interest in the building's preservation, which prompted the formation of a local historical society, which took over the building's ownership in 1973. The society maintains the building as a meeting space and local history museum.

== See also ==
- National Register of Historic Places listings in Orleans County, Vermont
