= District Number Four School =

- U.S. National Register of Historic Places
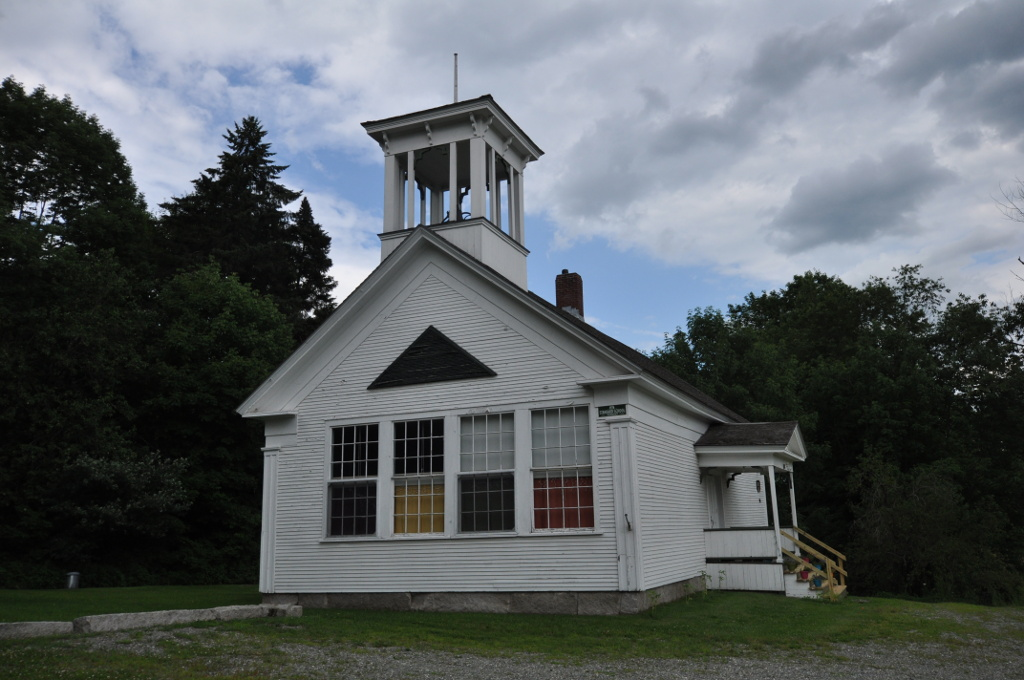

- Location within Vermont Location within the United States
- Location: 116 N. Craftsbury Rd., Craftsbury, Vermont
- Coordinates: 44°38′16″N 72°22′31″W
- Area: less than one acre
- Built: 1859
- Architectural style: Greek Revival
- MPS: Educational Resources of Vermont MPS
- NRHP reference No.: 01000825
- Added to NRHP: August 2, 2001

The District Number Four School is a historic district school building at 116 North Craftsbury Road in Craftsbury, Vermont. Built about 1859, it saw continuous use as a school building until 1980, and was soon afterward converted into a private residence. It was listed on the National Register of Historic Places in 2001.

== Description and history ==
The former District Number Four School stands on the western outskirts of Craftsbury village, on the north side of North Craftsbury Road across the street from the former Methodist church, which has been enlarged to serve as the village's elementary school. It is a single-story wood-frame structure, with a gabled roof, clapboarded exterior, and 20th-century concrete foundation. It has a central chimney, and an open square belfry at the street-facing gable end. It has Greek Revival styling, consisting of corner pilasters and an entablature that runs beneath the eaves. Windows are arranged on the gable ends as bands of sash windows. The interior, originally housing two classrooms, retains a number of original features despite the residential conversion, including bead-board wainscoting. The entrance is located near the center of the south side, sheltered by a gable-roofed porch supported by bracketed posts.

The school was built about 1859, most likely not long after Craftbury's fourth school district purchased the land on which it stands. The principal alterations during its use as a school came in the late 1920s, when its original window pattern was replaced by the present one in order to meet new state standards for lighting and ventilation. In 1963 the adjacent Methodist church building (built 1854) was taken over by the town after it was vacated by the congregation, and was adapted for use to meet increasing enrollment in the school; the original school building continued to serve the lower grades until 1980. It was converted into a residence in 1982.

== See also ==
- National Register of Historic Places listings in Orleans County, Vermont
