= Fox Hall, West Virginia =

Unincorporated community in West Virginia, United States

Fox Hall
- Unincorporated community
- Location within the state of West Virginia Fox Hall (the United States)
- Coordinates: 39°11′48″N 80°1′4″W
- Country: United States
- State: West Virginia
- County: Barbour
- Elevation: 1,306 ft (398 m)
- Time zone: UTC-5 (Eastern (EST))
  - Summer (DST): UTC-4 (EDT)
- GNIS ID: 1697061

Fox Hall was an unincorporated community in Barbour County, West Virginia, United States.
