= Goodrich Memorial Library =

- U.S. National Register of Historic Places
- U.S. Historic district – Contributing property
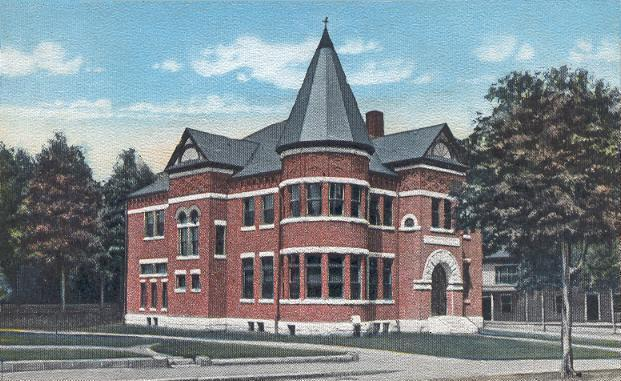
- Location: 202 Main St., Newport, Vermont United States
- Coordinates: 44°56′9.24″N 72°12′37.44″W
- Built: 1899
- Architect: William Storey
- Architectural style: Romanesque, Queen Anne
- Part of: Newport Downtown Historic District (ID06000898)
- NRHP reference No.: 83004228

Significant dates
- Added to NRHP: November 23, 1983
- Designated CP: September 28, 2006

The Goodrich Memorial Library is a public library in Newport, Orleans County, Vermont. It is the largest and only one of two full-time libraries in the county. It is located at 202 Main Street in downtown Newport, in a Romanesque building constructed in 1899.

== History ==
Converse Goodhue Goodrich and his wife, Almira, donated money for the construction of a free library. The land was worth $6000, the building $20,000. Construction was started in 1898. It dedicated on September 1, 1899. Architect William Storey designed the building.

The stock used to fund the operations of the library failed during the depression in 1933. This forced the library to enlist public support.

It opened with 6500 books.

In November 1983, it was placed on the National Register of Historic Places.

== Administration ==
The library budget for 2008 is $160,550. Newport city contributes $99,000 of this amount.

== Facilities ==
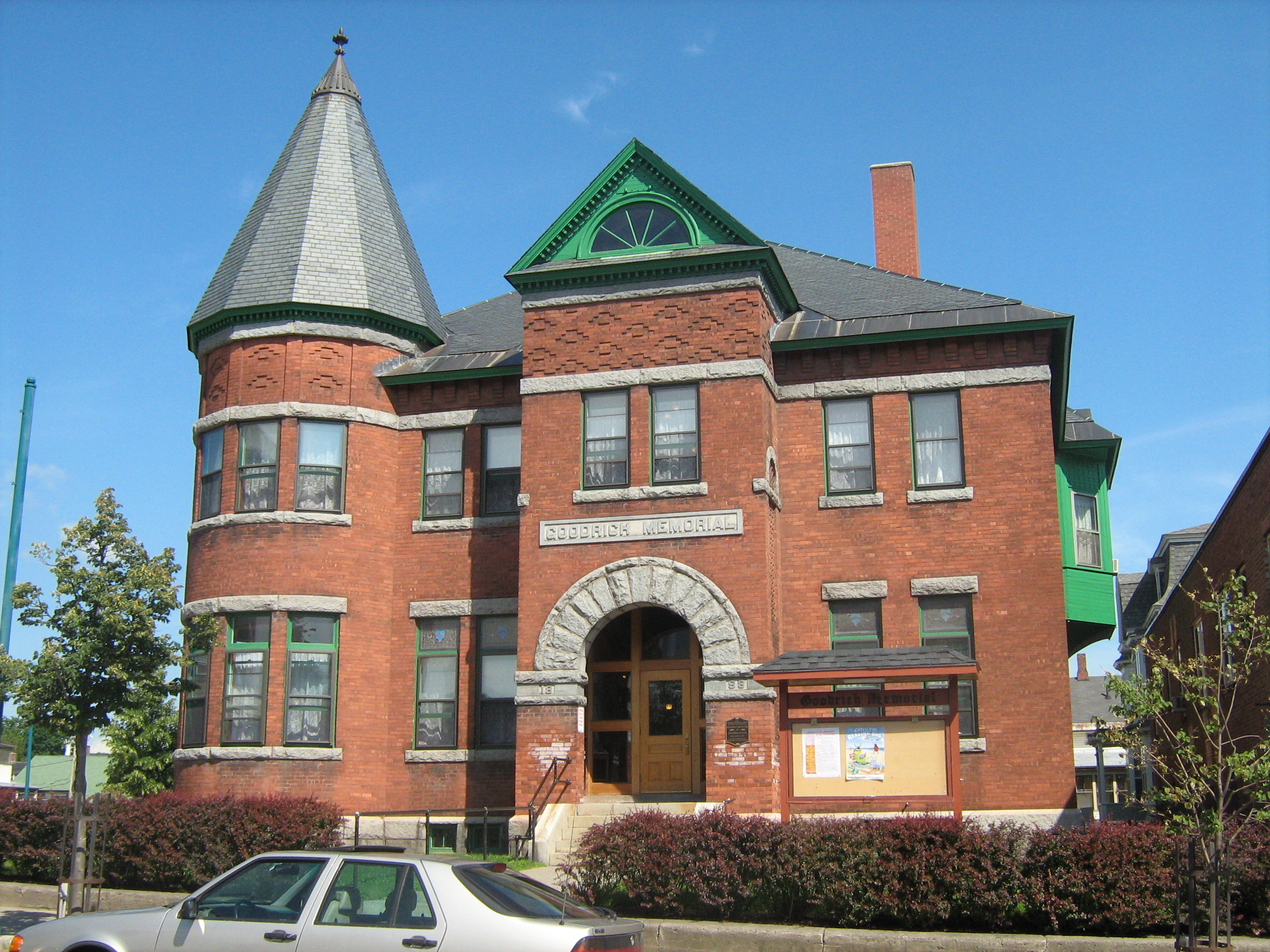

There are fireplaces fashioned of colored brick, rooms finished in red birch, Georgia pine, cypress, native spruce, Swanton red marble, with furnishings in quartered oak.

The upstairs hall consists of an art room, decorated more or less in period style, a long hall for meetings, an office, and a reading room. There are several old paintings on display in the art room, and a display case of postcards and paraphernalia from Newport's history.

Perhaps most noteworthy is the floor-to-ceiling wall of glass cases that house a variety of stuffed animals and natural curiosities. These include an alligator shot in Florida in the 1900s, an ostrich egg, and a flying squirrel found in Vermont. As they were originally preserved with mercury, they can only be handled and cared for by trained professionals.

== See also ==
- National Register of Historic Places listings in Orleans County, Vermont
