= Fox Hall (Westmore, Vermont) =

Historic house in Vermont, United States

- U.S. National Register of Historic Places
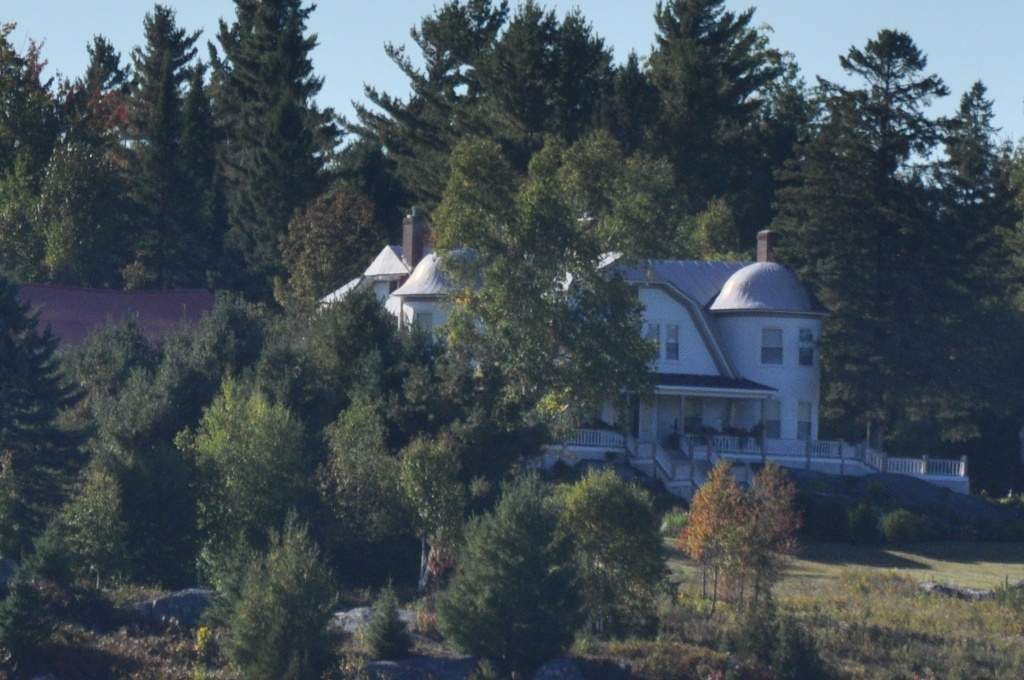

- Location within Vermont Location within the United States
- Location: Fox Hall Ln. off Peene Hill Rd., Westmore, Vermont
- Coordinates: 44°46′24″N 72°4′24″W
- Area: 1.5 acres (0.61 ha)
- Built: 1900
- Architectural style: Colonial Revival, Shingle Style
- NRHP reference No.: 84003468
- Added to NRHP: September 27, 1984

Fox Hall is a historic summer estate house in Westmore, Vermont. Built about 1900 by the then-mayor of Yonkers, New York, it was the first major summer resort property built in the remote town on the shores of Lake Willoughby. It is architecturally a distinctive blend of Colonial Revival and the Shingle style; the latter is a particularly uncommon style for northern Vermont. The house, along with a period icehouse, was listed on the National Register of Historic Places in 1984.

== Description and history ==
Fox Hall stands overlooking the northern part of Lake Willoughby, on a terrace above its western shore. It is accessed via Fox Lane, a private road extending east from Peene Hill Road, south of Vermont Route 16. The house is a 2 1/2-story wood-frame structure, with a side gambrel roof and clapboarded exterior. The front facade, oriented toward the lake, is defined by a broad central cross-gable gambrel dormer and flanking circular projections capped by bell-cast roofs. A porch extends across the width of this facade, but is only covered in the central section beneath the dormer by a shed roof. The interior retains original woodwork, most of which is modest in style and scale; the most ornate elements are found on the main staircase.

The town of Westmore was relatively remote and nearly inaccessible until 1852, when the road on Lake Willoughby's eastern shore (now Vermont Route 5A) was built. This led to an increase in population, and eventually also brought tourists to the area. By 1883, the town had a hotel in its center on the eastern shore. John and Ava Peene (he being the mayor of Yonkers, New York), began buying land on the northwestern shore of the lake in the 1899, and the house was probably completed by the following year. Ava Peene sold it after her husband's death in 1919, to a swindler who never paid her. He tried to operate a summer camp for children on the property, without success. Later owners of the property also operated summer camps, including the Keewaydin organization, which briefly had a girls camp here. The last camp to operate here closed in 1975. It has since also been operated as a bed and breakfast. During that time, the camp's former “mess hall” was converted to a makeshift theater, where well-acclaimed productions of “Biloxi Blues”, “The Rainmaker” and “One Flew Over The Cuckoo’s Nest” were performed. The property is now in private ownership.

== See also ==
- National Register of Historic Places listings in Orleans County, Vermont
