= Fox Hall (Fitchburg, Wisconsin) =

- U.S. National Register of Historic Places
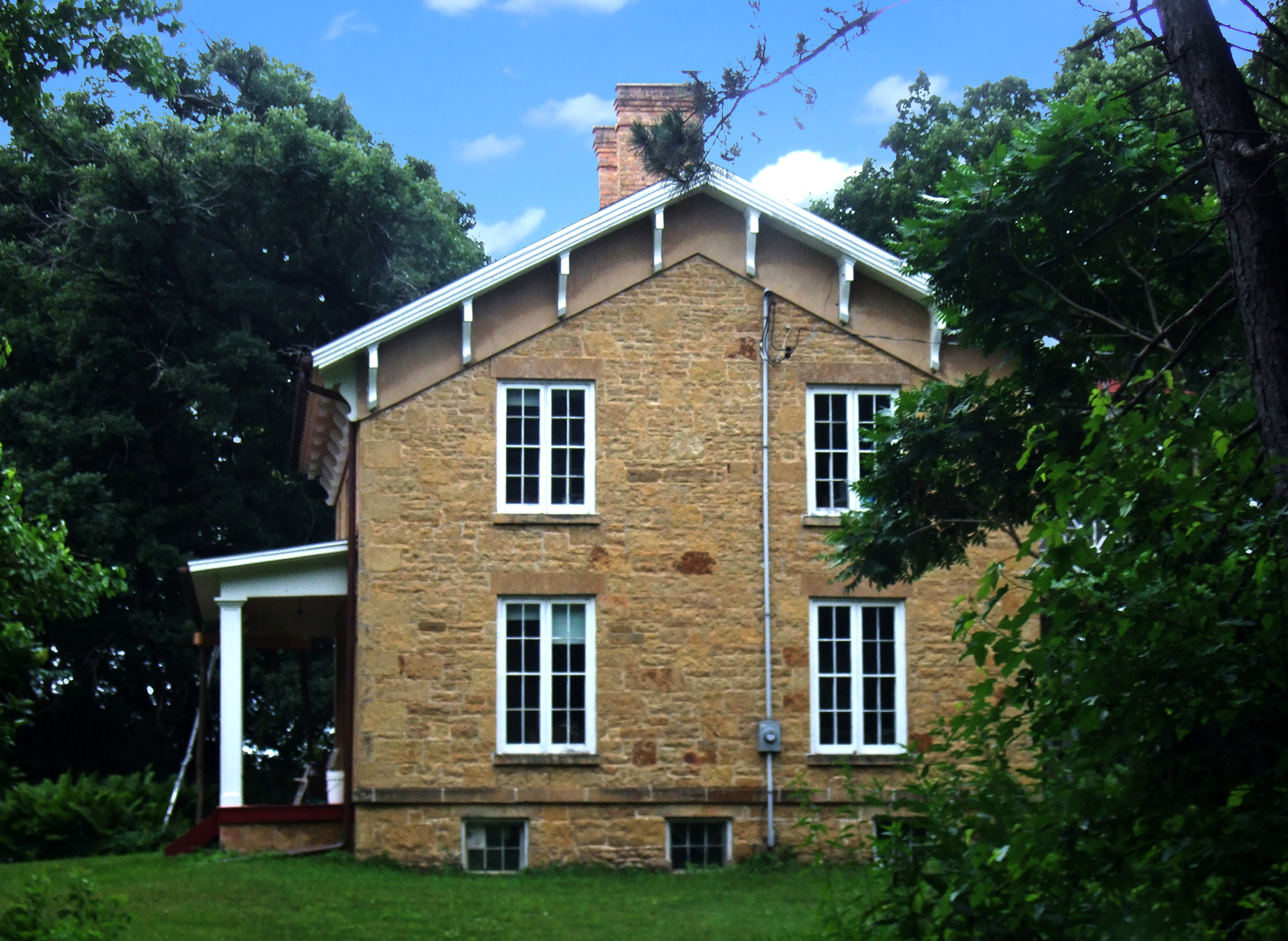

- Location within Wisconsin
- Location: 5183 County Highway M, Fitchburg, Wisconsin
- Coordinates: 42°56′57″N 89°24′01″W
- Area: 5.4 acres (2.2 ha)
- Built: 1856
- Architectural style: Greek Revival, Italianate
- NRHP reference No.: 83004273
- Added to NRHP: December 1, 1983

Fox Hall is a historic house at 5183 County Highway M in Fitchburg, Wisconsin. The stone farmhouse was built circa 1856 by the Fox family, who settled in Fitchburg in 1843 and had previously lived in a log cabin. The house's design includes elements of the Greek Revival and Italianate styles, representing the transitional period between the popularity of the two styles. The house has a symmetrical layout with a front and back porch, sash windows with stone lintels, bracketed eaves, and a gable roof with two stone chimneys. The interior is original and has extensive ornamental woodwork, including a carved walnut banister on the main staircase.

The house was added to the National Register of Historic Places on December 1, 1983.
