= Newport (city), Vermont =

City in Vermont, United States

Newport, Vermont
- City
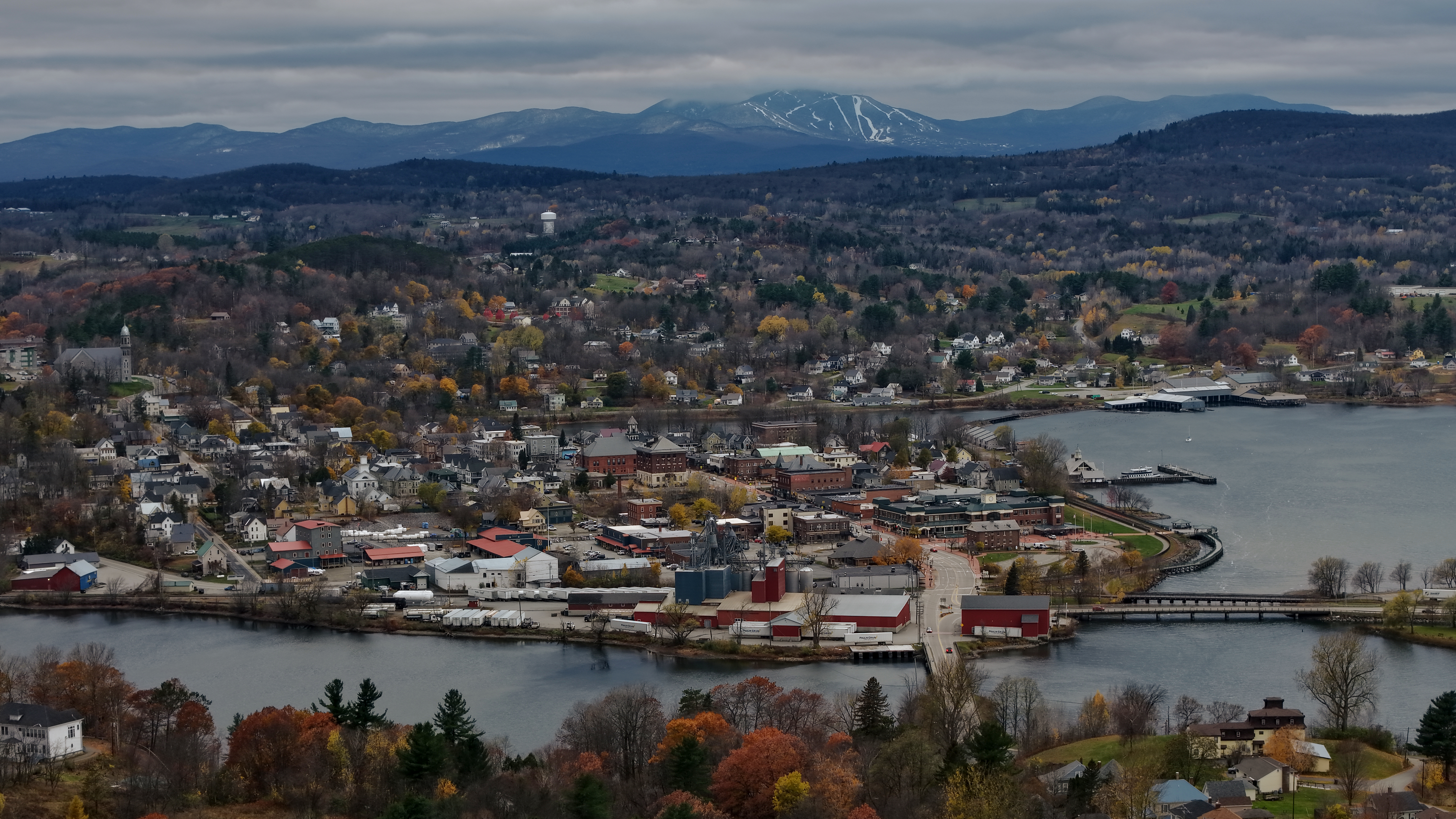
- Newport from the east

- Seal Logo

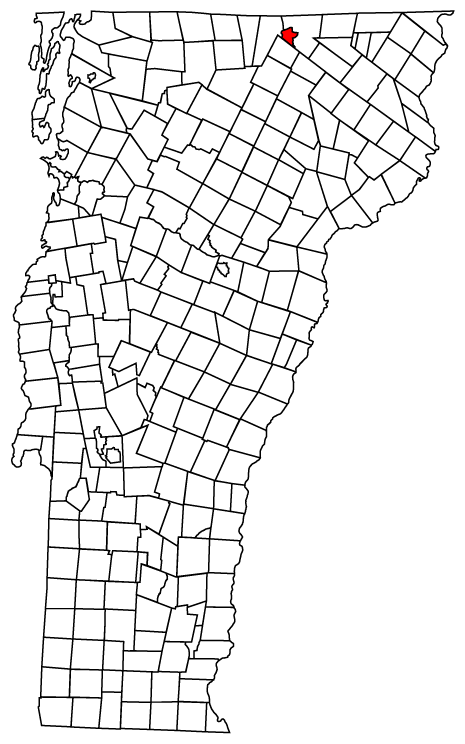
- Location in Vermont
- Coordinates: 44°56′14″N 72°12′32″W
- Country: United States
- State: Vermont
- County: Orleans
- Organized: 1918

Government
  - Mayor: Rick Ufford-Chase

Area
  - Total: 7.63 sq mi (19.76 km^{2})
  - Land: 5.83 sq mi (15.09 km^{2})
  - Water: 1.80 sq mi (4.67 km^{2}) 20.87%
- Elevation: 686 ft (209 m)

Population (2020)
  - Total: 4,455
  - Density: 764.6/sq mi (295.2/km^{2})
- Time zone: UTC−5 (Eastern (EST))
  - Summer (DST): UTC−4 (EDT)
- ZIP code: 05855
- Area code: 802
- FIPS code: 50-48850
- GNIS feature ID: 1462161
- Website: newportvermont.org

Newport is the only city in, and the shire town of, Orleans County, Vermont, United States. As of the 2020 Census, the population was 4,455. The city contains the second-largest population of any municipality in the county (only neighboring Derby is larger), and has the smallest geographic area. It is the second-smallest city by population in Vermont. Newport is also the name of neighboring Newport Town.

Newport was founded by European Americans as a settlement in 1793 and was first called Pickerel Point. It was the place where Rogers' Rangers retreated in 1759 after a French and Indian War incursion into Canada. In the 19th century, the village was stimulated by construction of the railroad in 1863, during the American Civil War. The lumbering firm Prouty & Miller operated here from 1865. Long after the post-war Reconstruction era, the village was the site for a Reunion Society of Vermont Officers in 1891. Newport has two public schools, one private school, and a branch of the Community College of Vermont. As of the 2010 census, there were 4,589 people.

== History ==
=== Early ===
Newport as a settlement was founded in 1793, after the American Revolutionary War. The village was first called Pickeral Point, but later renamed as Lake Bridge for its location at the head of Lake Memphremagog.

In 1816, part of the former town of Salem was annexed to the Town of Newport; it was absorbed into what was then a village.

The railroad was constructed to Newport in 1863. In 1868, the Lake Bridge settlement was incorporated as the Village of Newport. It became a busy lumber town. The lumbering firm of Prouty & Miller was started in 1865.

In 1919, the first city flag was made. It had a blue field with the seal of the city in the middle.

In 1932, during the Great Depression, the city operated a poor farm for the indigent, who worked for their board.

=== Transportation ===
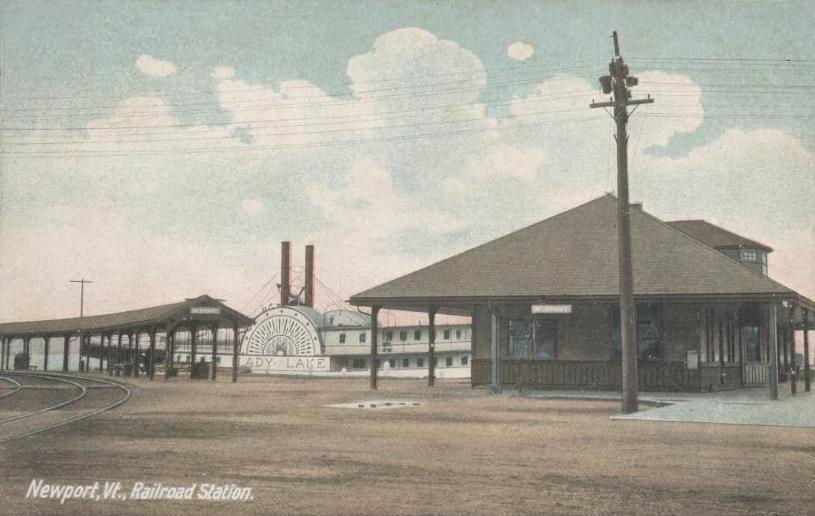
Railroad station and steamboat Lady of the Lake in 1908

The Lady of the Lake steam excursion/ferry boat started operating in 1867. It stopped operations in 1917. This steamboat is used as Newport's logo.

In 1868, a livery stable started operating behind a hotel, several blocks from the railway station, which opened in 1863. At its peak, its owner kept 100 horses there.

By the late 19th century, the Boston & Maine and Central Vermont railroads were routed through Lake Bridge. The small village expanded because of increased connections to outside markets and ease of transportation; it attracted more residents. By the late 20th century, railroad passenger traffic had declined because people relied on individual vehicles; the last passenger train left Newport in 1965.

In 1917, the city paved Main Street. By the summer of 1930, traffic on the street had increased to 4,000 motor vehicles a day.

The city sold its airport to the state of Vermont in the 1970s.

=== Military ===
Rogers' Rangers, a Vermont militia, were forced to retreat through the county following their attack on Saint-Francis, Quebec in 1759, during the French and Indian War. To confound their pursuers, they split up on the east shore of Lake Memphremagog. One group followed the Clyde River east. Another followed the Barton River south.

In the early 19th century, the women of pioneer Calvin Arnold's household refused to continue to live there. It was located near what is now Clyde Pond, and subject to raids by Indians.

During the American Civil War, the city had a scare when they received news of the St. Albans Raid. They thought these raids might repeat throughout the state, particularly at the south end of the lake. The militia was turned out. The ferry from Magog was met with determined-looking armed men, much to the captain's surprise, who had heard nothing about the raid. Armed Norwich University students were shipped in by train. Nothing happened and everyone was sent home after a few days.

In 1891, the American Civil War Reunion Society of Vermont Officers held its annual reunion in Newport.

In August 1942, a single-engine Royal Canadian Air Force (RCAF) training plane crashed into the lake near the west shore and the city, killing the pilot, the only occupant.

=== Architecture ===
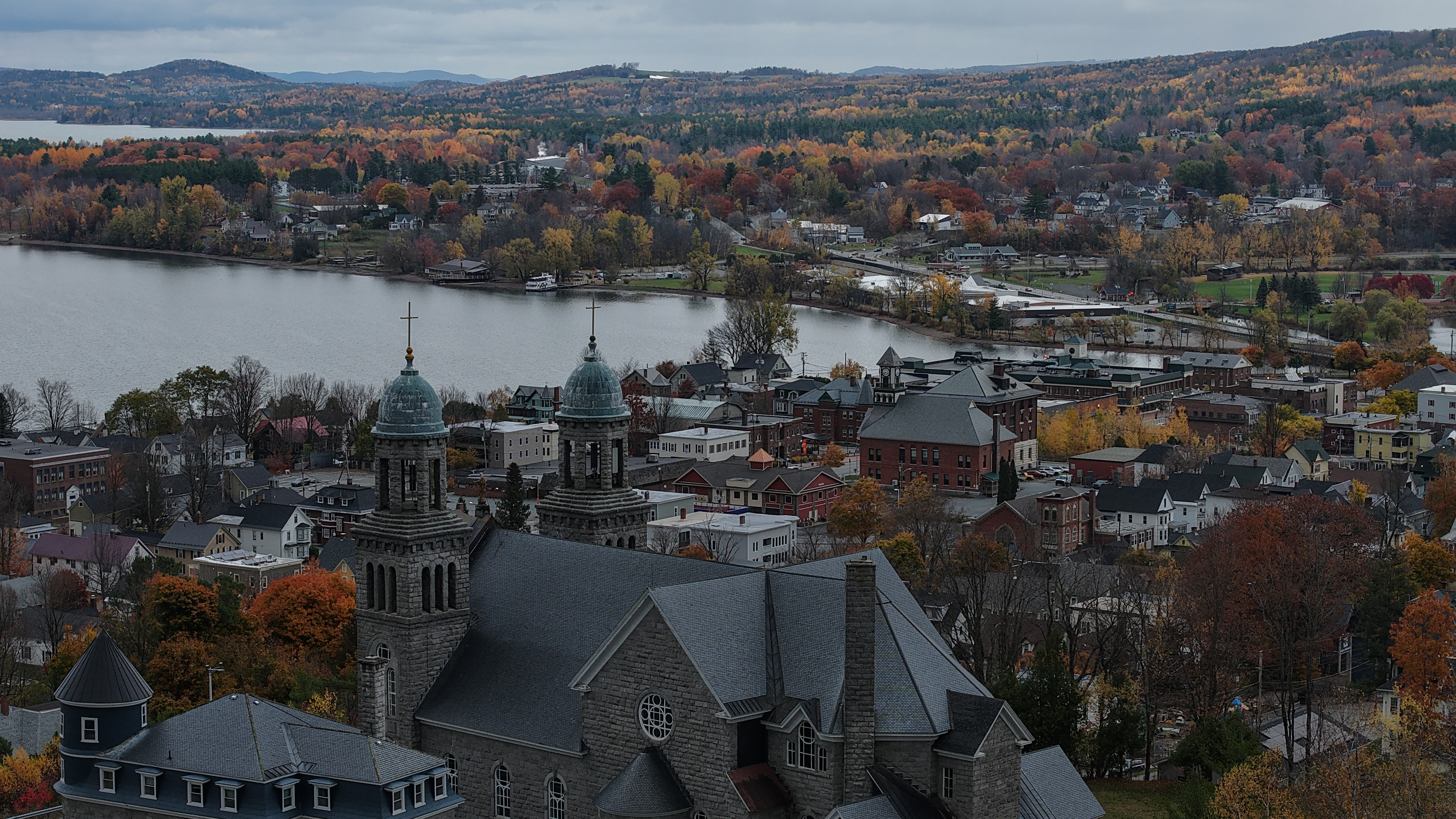
Newport, VT, from the southwest

In 1873, the Bellevue Hotel was built to accommodate 75; later it expanded to hold 100 guests. It was renamed as the Newport House by 1891. It was demolished in 1973. The Memphremagog Hotel burned in 1907.

The Newport Wharf Light was a tower built on Lake Memphremagog in 1879. It has since been demolished.

The current county courthouse was built in 1886. That was the year that the legislature moved the shire town here. In 1879, the Field Opera House and Clock Tower was constructed. In 1896, it was destroyed by fire. The municipal building was later constructed at this site.

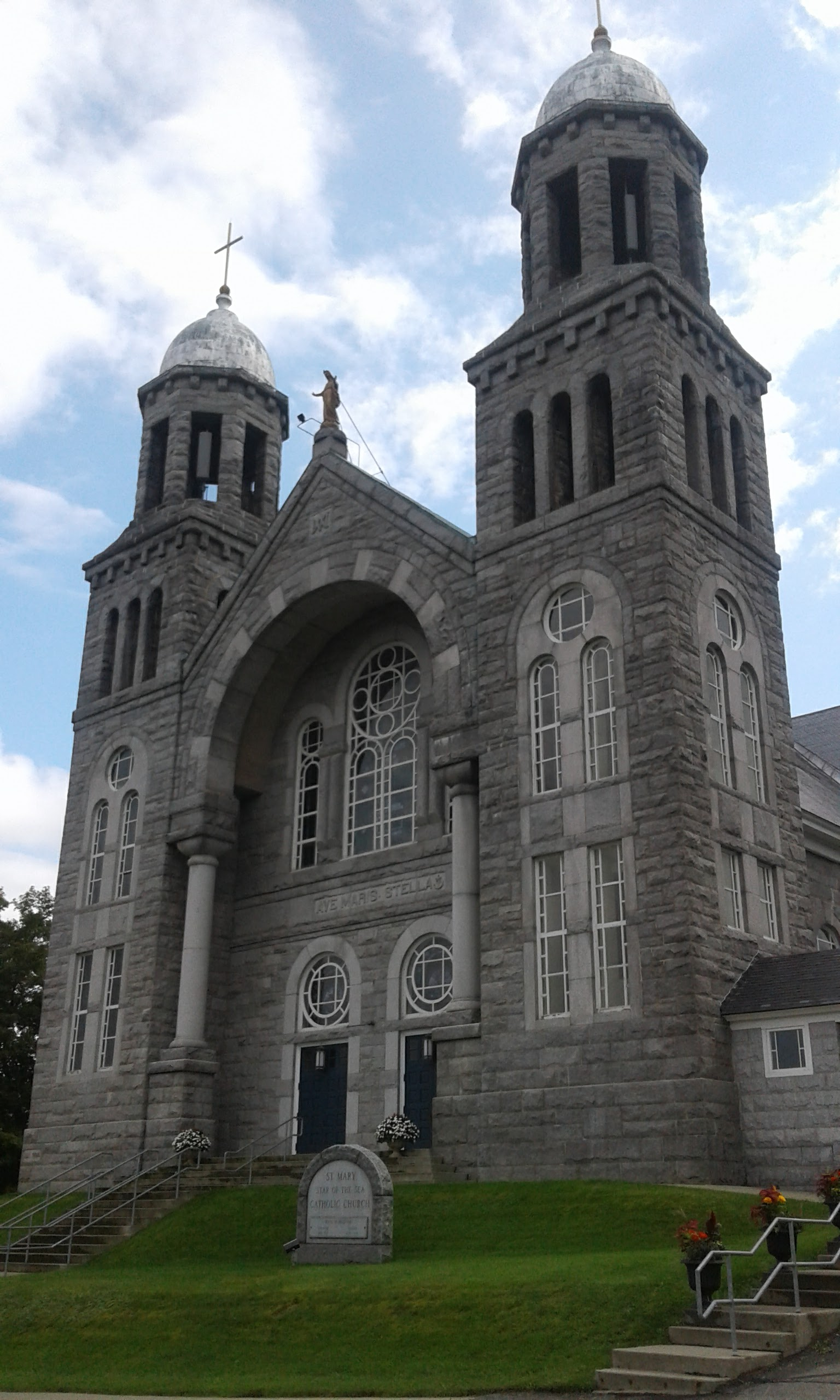
St. Mary Star of the Sea Catholic Church, completed 1877.

Lane's Opera House was constructed in 1892. It burned in 1923.

The Goodrich Memorial Library was built in 1899. The parochial Sacred Heart School was opened in 1904 as part of the Burlington Roman Catholic Diocese School District. It closed in the fall of 2007 because of falling enrollment.

In 1917, the city of Newport was formed from portions of the towns of Newport (former village of Newport) and Derby (former village of West Derby). It was organized on March 5, 1918. The four elementary schools were named after the section of the city they were in: East, West, and South schools. Newport High was across from the West School. There were 60 businesses downtown; east, west and south had an additional 40 businesses.

The current federal courthouse was built in 1904. At the time, it included the United States post office, which has since relocated to a more modern facility.

The city was once divided into at least five neighborhoods: Chief-O, Stove-Pipe City, Skunk Hollow, French Village, and Batesville. Most of these names are not used in the 21st century. Batesville was the section around Prouty Bay. Skunk Hollow was in the valley west of Western Avenue.

=== Business ===
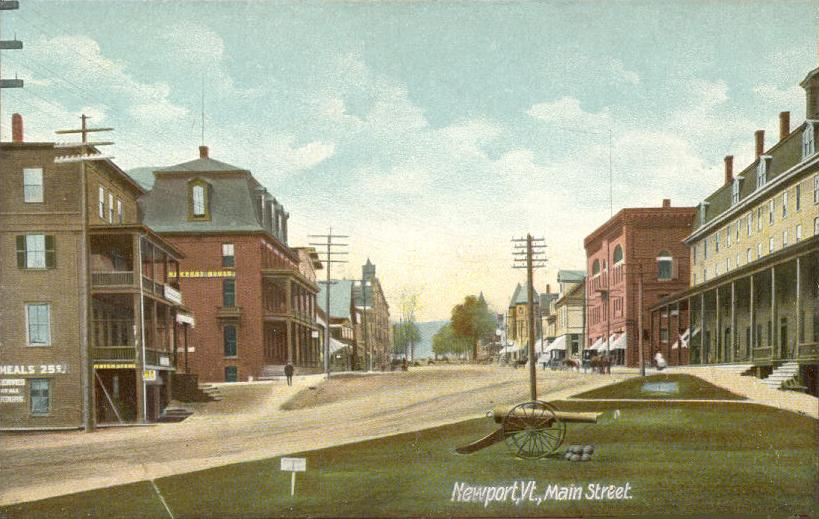
Main Street in 1908

The lumbering firm Prouty & Miller, started in 1865. It operated for more than 100 years, closing in the 1980s.

The Frost Veneer Mill, located on Prouty Bay, was once a primary employer in the Batesville neighborhood.

Between 1936 and 1953, the International Club in Newport had the largest dance floor in New England. 220 by 60 feet (67 by 18 m). It could hold 2,000 dancers. Notable national performers entertained here while en route between the larger cities of Boston and Montreal, traveling on the Boston & Maine trains. They included: Louis Armstrong, Charlie Barnet, Les Brown, Cab Calloway, Rosemary Clooney, the Dorsey Brothers, Jimmy and Tommy; Stan Kenton, Kay Kyser, Gene Krupa, Glenn Miller, Tony Pastor, and Louis Prima.

In 2003, the Newport-headquartered Citizens Utility was sold. Its assets and operations were divided between Great Bay Hydro and Vermont Electric Cooperative. The Vermont Teddy Bear Company once had a plant within the city. A Columbia Forest Products plant employed about 100 workers. A local subsidiary of an international ski clothing manufacturer once employed 30 workers. It closed in 2011.

== Geography ==
According to the United States Census Bureau, the city has a total area of 7.6 square miles (20 square kilometres), of which 6.0 square miles (16 km^{2}) is land and 1.6 square miles (4.1 km^{2}) (20.87%) is water. The city surrounds the southern shore of Lake Memphremagog. Three of the four major rivers in the county empty into the lake here: the Clyde, Barton, and the Black.

Newport borders the towns of Coventry to the south, Newport to the west, and Derby to the north and east.

=== Climate ===
Climate data for Newport, Vermont (1991–2020 normals, extremes 1930–present)
Month	Jan	Feb	Mar	Apr	May	Jun	Jul	Aug	Sep	Oct	Nov	Dec	Year
Record high °F (°C)	64 (18)	68 (20)	83 (28)	87 (31)	94 (34)	95 (35)	98 (37)	95 (35)	96 (36)	84 (29)	75 (24)	66 (19)	98 (37)
Mean maximum °F (°C)	46.8 (8.2)	50.4 (10.2)	59.2 (15.1)	76.1 (24.5)	84.7 (29.3)	89.1 (31.7)	89.5 (31.9)	88.4 (31.3)	84.9 (29.4)	75.1 (23.9)	63.7 (17.6)	51.1 (10.6)	90.0 (32.2)
Mean daily maximum °F (°C)	23.4 (−4.8)	27.1 (−2.7)	36.6 (2.6)	50.8 (10.4)	64.8 (18.2)	73.1 (22.8)	77.7 (25.4)	76.2 (24.6)	68.9 (20.5)	54.8 (12.7)	41.1 (5.1)	29.2 (−1.6)	52.0 (11.1)
Daily mean °F (°C)	13.7 (−10.2)	16.0 (−8.9)	25.8 (−3.4)	40.0 (4.4)	53.3 (11.8)	62.3 (16.8)	67.2 (19.6)	65.3 (18.5)	57.8 (14.3)	45.2 (7.3)	33.2 (0.7)	21.3 (−5.9)	41.8 (5.4)
Mean daily minimum °F (°C)	3.9 (−15.6)	5.0 (−15.0)	14.9 (−9.5)	29.2 (−1.6)	41.9 (5.5)	51.6 (10.9)	56.6 (13.7)	54.5 (12.5)	46.8 (8.2)	35.6 (2.0)	25.3 (−3.7)	13.5 (−10.3)	31.6 (−0.2)
Mean minimum °F (°C)	−19.6 (−28.7)	−15.1 (−26.2)	−8.7 (−22.6)	16.1 (−8.8)	28.8 (−1.8)	38.7 (3.7)	46.2 (7.9)	43.0 (6.1)	32.3 (0.2)	23.3 (−4.8)	8.3 (−13.2)	−9.0 (−22.8)	−21.9 (−29.9)
Record low °F (°C)	−38 (−39)	−38 (−39)	−32 (−36)	−2 (−19)	20 (−7)	28 (−2)	36 (2)	32 (0)	23 (−5)	11 (−12)	−7 (−22)	−40 (−40)	−40 (−40)
Average precipitation inches (mm)	2.83 (72)	2.44 (62)	2.83 (72)	3.34 (85)	3.94 (100)	4.52 (115)	4.54 (115)	4.42 (112)	3.93 (100)	4.29 (109)	3.35 (85)	3.40 (86)	43.83 (1,113)
Average snowfall inches (cm)	21.5 (55)	20.2 (51)	18.4 (47)	4.5 (11)	0.0 (0.0)	0.0 (0.0)	0.0 (0.0)	0.0 (0.0)	0.0 (0.0)	0.8 (2.0)	7.0 (18)	25.2 (64)	98.6 (250)
Average extreme snow depth inches (cm)	15.7 (40)	20.7 (53)	20.9 (53)	9.0 (23)	0.0 (0.0)	0.0 (0.0)	0.0 (0.0)	0.0 (0.0)	0.0 (0.0)	0.6 (1.5)	5.0 (13)	11.4 (29)	24.6 (62)
Average precipitation days (≥ 0.01 in)	17.9	13.2	13.7	13.2	14.4	15.0	14.5	13.3	11.8	14.9	15.2	17.0	174.1
Average snowy days (≥ 0.1 in)	14.3	10.8	8.6	2.4	0.1	0.0	0.0	0.0	0.0	0.6	4.9	11.7	53.4
Source: NOAA

== Demographics ==
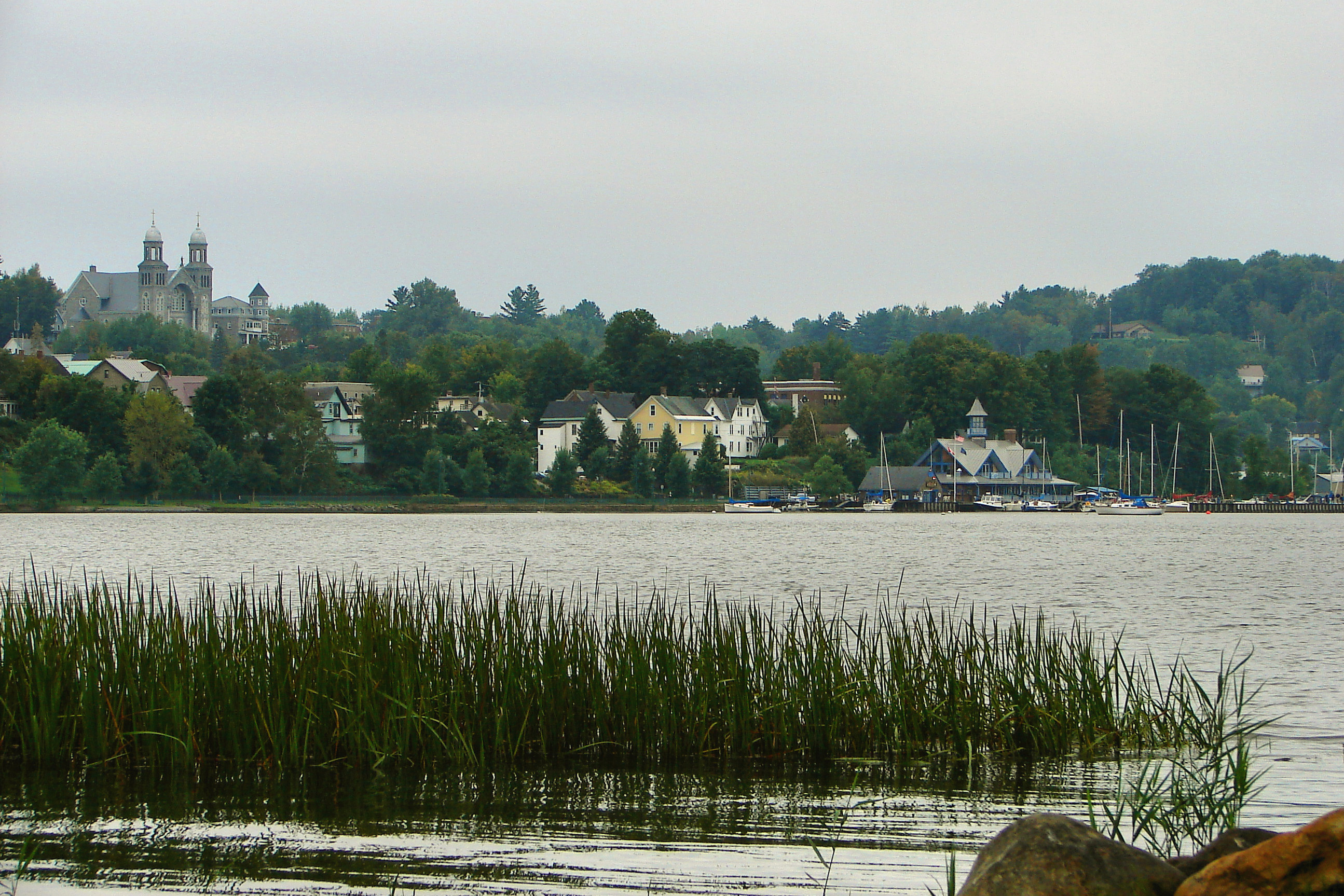
Newport seen across Lake Memphremagog

Historical population
Census	Pop.	Note	%±
1880	920		—
1890	1,730		88.0%
1900	2,787		61.1%
1910	3,657		31.2%
1920	4,976		36.1%
1930	5,094		2.4%
1940	4,902		−3.8%
1950	5,217		6.4%
1960	5,019		−3.8%
1970	4,664		−7.1%
1980	4,756		2.0%
1990	4,434		−6.8%
2000	5,005		12.9%
2010	4,589		−8.3%
2020	4,455		−2.9%
U.S. Decennial Census

From its founding, Newport's population plateaued around 5,000 people until 1950 when it started dropping. It reached bottom in 1990 at 4,434. In 2010 the population dropped from the 2000 census, and it still had not reached its 1950 high which was 5,217. As of the census of 2010, there were 4,589 people, 2,086 households, and 1,191 families residing in the city. The population density was 830.0 people per square mile (320.5/km^{2}). There were 2,342 housing units at an average density of 388.4 per square mile (150.0/km^{2}). The racial makeup of the city was 96.14% White, 0.76% Black or African American, 0.62% Native American, 0.62% Asian, 0.22% from other races, and 1.64% from two or more races. Hispanic or Latino of any race were 1.28% of the population. Thirty-three percent were of French Canadian and French ancestry, 16% English, and 14% Irish.

There were 2,086 households, out of which 26.6% had children under the age of 18 living with them, 41.0% were married couples living together, 12.6% had a female householder with no husband present, and 42.9% were non-families. 35.5% of all households were made up of individuals, and 16.0% had someone living alone who was 65 years of age or older. The average household size was 2.20 and the average family size was 2.84.

In the city, the population was distributed by age with 22.2% under 18, 8.3% from 18 to 24, 27.1% from 25 to 44, 23.1% from 45 to 64, and 19.3% who were 65 years of age or older. The median age was 40 years. For every 100 females, there were 97.4 males. For every 100 females age 18 and over, there were 93.7 males.

In 2013, about 31% of adults in the area were obese. This was the highest in the state.

== Economy ==
=== Personal income ===
In 2017, the median income for a household in the city was $34,000. The median income for the state was $53,700. The median income for a family was $34,922. Males had a median income of $33,810 versus $19,787 for females. The per capita income for the city was $20,054. About 13.0% of families and 18.2% of the population were below the poverty line, including 25.4% of those under age 18 and 5.4% of those age 65 or over.

=== Industry ===
Poulin Grain ships farm feed products to customers in New England and upstate New York. It employs about 50 workers. The plant produces feed 24 hours a day, seven days a week.

A Columbia Forest Products plant employs about 100 workers.

A call center employs 120 people.

MSA manufactures military combat helmets.

=== Health industry ===
North Country Hospital is the city's largest employer, employing 605 people.

=== Tourism ===
A commercial ice fishing derby has been held in February since 2004. In 2010, there were 920 participants.

The only Soap Box Derby in Vermont is held in the city annually. The winner represents the state in the nationals.

The local Rotary has held an annual music festival involving county high schools since 1947.

=== Non-local government ===
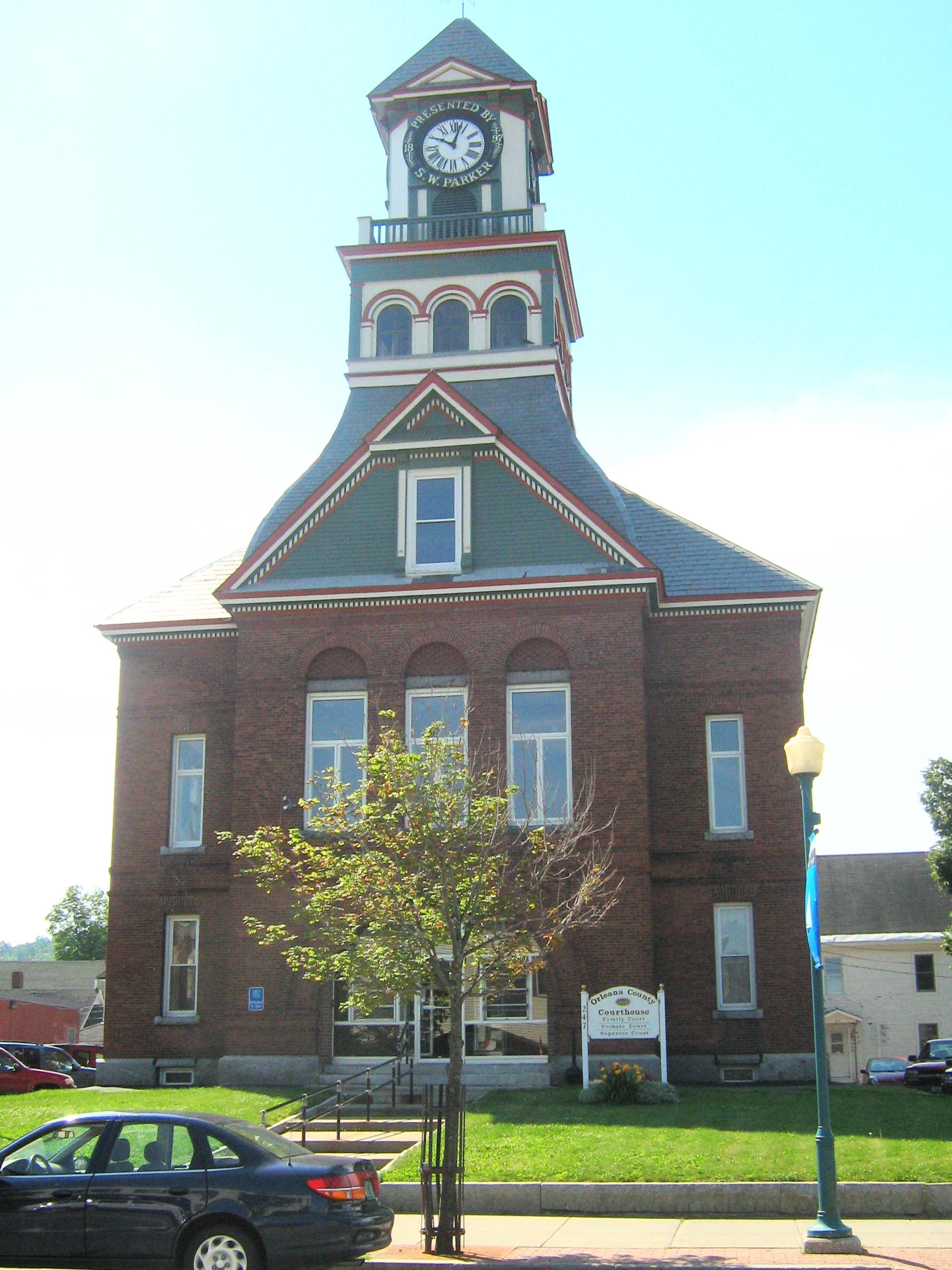
Orleans County courthouse in Newport

The Northern State Correctional Facility, Newport Court, Reparative Services, and Vermont Correctional Industries are located in the city.

== City government ==
Municipal offices are located in the former National Guard Armory, 222 Main Street, Newport.

Elected government consists of four aldermen with staggered two-year terms and a mayor.

The city has a paid staff for tax assessment/zoning administrator, public works department, police, fire, recreation and parks, city attorney, and harbor master.

There are decision-making boards which are filled by unpaid appointees: planning commission (5 people, three-year terms), harbor commission (5 people, two-year terms), development review board (nine people, three-year terms), and a recreation committee.

There are normal officers for Vermont cities and sometimes towns, except they are appointed for cities: Delinquent tax collector, town service officer, animal control, health officer, tree warden, weigher of coal, inspector of wood and shingles, representative to NVDA (Northeastern Vermont Development Association) board, representative to EDC board (Vermont Economic Development Authority), and Fence Viewers.

Budget (proposed 2014–2015) – $2.99 million. About $1 million is for the police force.

In 2017, the Grand List (total of taxable property) was $399 million. About 25% of this is non-taxable, belonging to government and religious entities.

=== Officials ===
The city is governed under the mayor-council system. In 2025, its mayor is Rick Ufford-Chase. The council is composed of Kevin Charboneau, Council President, Carter Finegan, Kevin Tochette, and John Monette. The city clerk/treasurer is James D. Johnson, and the city manager is empty.

=== Former mayors ===
Mayors of Newport, Vermont

1. Curtis S. Emery 1918–1919
2. James T. Gardner 1919–1921
3. Ernest W. Savage 1921–1922
4. William C. Lindsay 1922–1925
5. Tom C. Camp 1925–1926
6. J.E.McCarten 1926–1931
7. F.D. Burns 1931–1932
8. R.W.H. Davis 1932–1933
9. H.W. Fairbrother 1933–1934
10. John M. Bradley 1934–1938
11. Winston L. Prouty 1938–1941
12. O.S. Searles 1941–1945
13. R.E. Blake 1945–1947
14. L.H. McIver 1947
15. P.J. Moore 1947–1949
16. F.B. Crawford 1949–1952
17. R.E. Blake 1952–1953
18. F.L. Jenne 1953–1955
19. J.W. Natole 1955–1960
20. F.P. Davis 1960–1962
21. E.W. Logan 1962–1965
22. M.H. Carter 1965–1967
23. K.M. Frawley 1967–1968
24. Paul Bouffard 1968–1969
25. C.G. Schuman, Jr. 1969–1971
26. F.H. Spates 1971–1974
27. Augustus Parsons 1974–1976
28. William V. Caputo 1976–1980
29. Kenneth W. Magoon 1980–1982
30. Betty-Jane Durkee 1982–1985, the first woman mayor
31. Michael Bresette 1985–1987
32. Charles Pronto 1987–1991
33. Douglas B. Spates 1991–1993
34. Karin Zisselsberger 1993–1999
35. Reynold R. Choiniere 1999–2003
36. Richard M. Baraw 2003–2005
37. Elwood "Woody" Guyette 2005–2009
38. Paul Monette 2009–2023

=== Elections ===
Fifty-four percent of those registered voted in the 2008 general election. This was the lowest turnout in the county.

== Education ==
Newport has two public schools: an elementary school, Newport City Elementary, and a high school, North Country Union High School. There is one private school, the United Christian Academy. In 1996, United Christian Academy was formed, uniting Roman Catholic and Protestant churches in offering high school education. The school began offering elementary education following the closure of Sacred Heart School in 2006.

=== School districts ===
The city has a school board that governs operations at Newport Elementary. The budget for the Newport City Elementary School was $4,435,765 in 2007. In addition, the city belongs to the North Country Supervisory Union with members from nearby towns. They operate the North Country Union High School and the North Country Union Junior High School. The supervisor hired by this union board supervises the town school, as well as the union schools.

=== Higher education ===
Newport is home to a branch of the Community College of Vermont, which enrolls nearly 300 students.

== Infrastructure ==
=== Transportation ===
==== Major routes ====
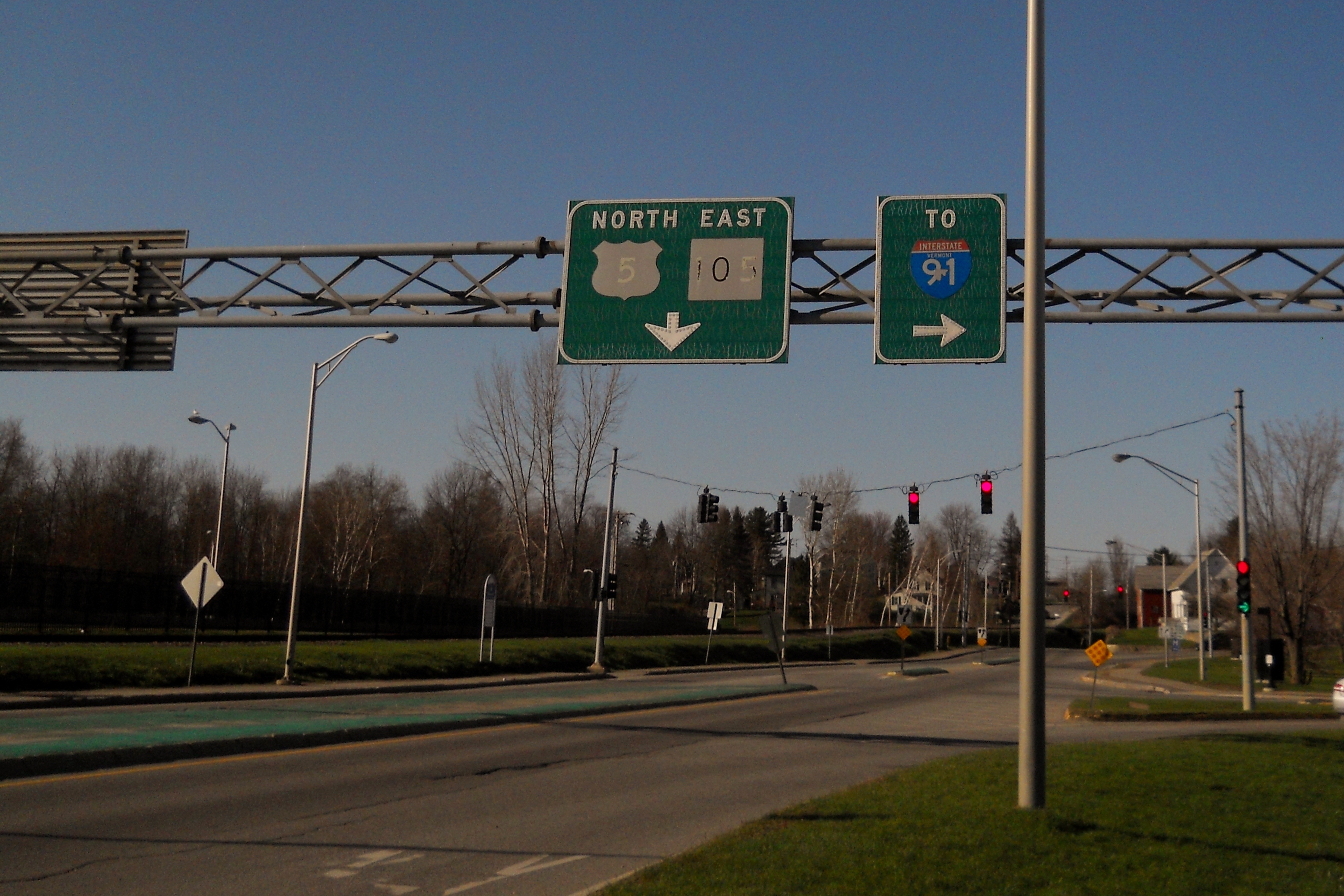
U.S. Route 5 in Newport at the junction of Vermont Route 191 heading toward Interstate 91.

- U.S. Route 5 – connects the city with the town of Coventry to the south, and the town of Derby to the north and east
- VT Route 105 – connects the city with the Town of Newport, and the town of Derby (concurrent with route 5)
- VT Route 191 – "Access Road", connects I-91, Exit 27, to the city of Newport

U.S. Route 5 and VT Route 105 are concurrent through much of their routes through the city.

Interstate 91 is the nearest interstate highway, and runs through the neighboring town of Derby. Two exits (for VT Route 191 and for US 5/VT 105) provide access to Newport.

The city has six stoplights, which is most of the stoplights in the county. Five are on Route 5.

==== Major bridges ====
There are three major bridges over the South Bay of Lake Memphremagog, two of which connect two parts of the city, the former village of Newport with the former village of West Derby. Those two are the bridge on Route 5, and the "Long Bridge" connecting Route 5 to Mt. Vernon Street. Plans are underway to replace this latter bridge starting in 2012. It will cost about $5.26 million. The state will pay 90%; the city, the remainder.

The final bridge is the trestle for the railway.

==== Local community public and private transportation ====
RCT (Rural Community Transportation), a non-profit organization, runs out of Saint Johnsbury and serves Caledonia, Essex, and Orleans counties. For general use, there are four buses north and south during the week from west Newport city to Derby, and two buses each way on Saturday. There is no bus fare.

==== Airport ====
The city is served by the Northeast Kingdom International Airport. It contains two runways. Runway 18/36 is 5301 x 100 ft. and Runway 5/23 is 3996 x 100 ft.

=== Sewage ===
The city discharged an average of 908,917 US gallons (3,440,630 L; 756,832 imp gal) of treated wastewater daily into the Clyde River in 2003–2004.

=== Media ===
- The Newport Daily Express – published daily except Saturdays and Sundays in Newport. Owned by Horizon Publications out of Marion, Illinois. Printed in Canada.
- Newport Dispatch – online-only news updated daily.

== Notable people ==
- Charles Francis Adams, first owner of the Boston Bruins
- Harry A. Black, Secretary of State of Vermont
- Reginald W. Buzzell, U.S. Army brigadier general, resided in Newport
- David M. Camp, Lieutenant Governor of Vermont, 1836–1841
- Walter H. Cleary, Chief Justice of the Vermont Supreme Court
- Rudolph J. Daley, Associate Justice of the Vermont Supreme Court
- Samuel Douglass, member of the Vermont Senate implicated in the Young Republican group chat leaks scandal
- Lane Dwinell, 69th governor of New Hampshire
- John L. Edwards, Attorney and politician, Democratic nominee for governor of Vermont in 1867 and 1868
- Duane Graveline, astronaut
- Aaron H. Grout, son of Josiah Grout and Vermont Secretary of State
- Josiah Grout, 46th governor of Vermont
- George H. Prouty, 52nd governor of Vermont
- Winston L. Prouty, United States Senator
- William Weston, politician who served in the Vermont Senate, lived and worked in Newport
