= Northeast Kingdom Community Action =

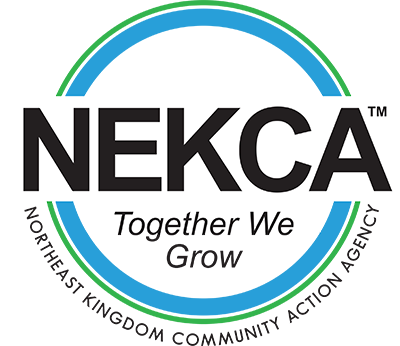
- Abbreviation: NEKCA
- Founded: 1980; 46 years ago
- Type: Nonprofit organization
- Tax ID no.: 03-0276709
- Legal status: 501(c)(3)
- Location(s): St. Johnsbury and Newport, Vermont
- Region served: Caledonia County, Orleans County, and Essex County, Vermont
- Services: Food, housing and shelter, fuel/utility assistance, early education, parenting support, restorative justice, community re-integration, business development, job training
- Executive Director: Jenna O’Farrell
- Board of Directors Chair: Martha Hill
- Revenue: $7,366,058 (2015)
- Expenses: $7,332,757 (2015)
- Employees: 201 (2014)
- Volunteers: 90 (2014)
- Website: www.nekcavt.org
- Formerly called: Orleans County Council of Social Agencies

Northeast Kingdom Community Action (NEKCA) is an anti-poverty community action agency that helps people in Vermont's Northeast Kingdom meet their basic needs and become self-sufficient. The agency is a partner of the Vermont Department for Children and Families and is primarily funded by federal and state government resources.

== Foundation ==
The first Community Action Agency in the Northeast Kingdom was the Orleans County Council of Social Agencies (OCCSA), created in a June 20, 1968 Executive Order by the Governor of Vermont. It was headquartered at the Old Customs building on Main Street in Newport. After the United States Community Services Administration decided to not continue funding OCCSA, Northeast Kingdom Community Action (NEKCA) was established in 1980 in a July 3, 1980 Executive Order by Vermont Governor Richard A. Snelling, to "work cooperatively with the other Community Action Agencies in the State and with the State Economic Opportunity Office as well as other state agencies in the planning, development, implementation, and evaluation of programs to be carried out within the State of Vermont under the auspices of Economic Opportunity Act of 1964, as amended."

== Locations ==
Northeast Kingdom Community Action's headquarters is located in the historic United States Customs House Building at 70 Main Street in Newport, Vermont. It has administrative offices in St. Johnsbury and Newport with satellite facilities in Island Pond and Canaan.

== Leadership ==
Northeast Kingdom Community Action (NEKCA) is led by executive director Jenna O’Farrell. In 2018, O'Farrell replaced Joe Patrissi, who served as executive director since 2010.

NEKCA's community partners are the Vermont Foodbank, Northern Counties Health Care, RuralEdge, Northeast Kingdom Human Services (NEKHS), the Northeast Kingdom Council on Aging, and Northeastern Vermont Regional Hospital. NEKCA also partners with the Center for Rural Studies (CRS) at University of Vermont for data collection.

== Program services ==
Northeast Kingdom Community Action (NEKCA) serves the Northeast Kingdom of Vermont, which according the Northeast Kingdom Human Services (NEKHS), "continues to have the deepest poverty in Vermont," and "poor health outcomes." NEKHS also writes, "The Vermont Department of Health (VDH) ranks the fourteen counties in Vermont each year and two of the three counties in the Kingdom continuously score in last place."

According to NEKCA Executive Director Jenna O'Farrell, "Community Action Agencies were founded in 1964 by President Johnson [...] in the Economic Opportunity Act," and the "idea behind the initial and present funding is to allow community needs to be evaluated at the local level." NEKCA is therefore able to "locally allocate and spend federal dollars in order to offer specialized programming in the Northeast Kingdom." NEKCA services address "food insecurity, housing and homelessness, warmth, early education, parenting support, community re-integration, restorative justice, business development and employment training."

=== Food Assistance ===
NEKCA helps people apply for 3SquaresVT (formerly called "Food Stamps") and distributes Farm to Family coupons in partnership with the Vermont Department for Children and Families to income-eligible households, to help buy fruit and vegetables at local Farmer's Markets.

In November 2020, NEKCA worked with St. Johnsbury Rotary members to collect nearly 700 pounds of food and supplies donations for the community.

=== Fuel and Utility Assistance ===
NEKCA provides Crisis Fuel and Electricity Assistance, Supplemental Fuel Assistance, Electric Cost Assistance, and administers a Furnace Repair and Replacement program to income-eligible households.

=== Housing and Shelter Assistance ===
NEKCA offers housing counseling, financial assistance, and transitional housing and shelter. NEKCA provides a variety of housing supports for homeless adults, teens, and families, including shelters and covering the cost of temporary motel stays, as well as transitional housing for people after release from prison.

In 2019, The Associated Press profiled the St. Johnsbury Area Warming Shelter, created by Northeast Kingdom Human Services (NEKHS) and Northeast Kingdom Community Action (NEKCA), and interviewed NEKCA staff.

NEKCA was able to increase housing assistance during the COVID-19 pandemic due to changes in DCF rules. In January 2021, NEKCA Executive Director O'Farrell was quoted in commentary published in VTDigger that discusses the link between stable housing and beneficial health outcomes: "When you know where you’re going to be each night, you can start to make plans. And for service providers, we can provide consistent support, where the person has a consistent place to stay. It’s much easier to make sure a child has the technology to remote learn or a person using a wheelchair has access to a shower or a person can get needed medication — it’s much easier to support that, when we know where that person is going to be. This kind of support is foundational for ending homelessness, but people who are homeless also really need a permanent place to live. People need homes."

=== Parent Child Centers ===
NEKCA's Parent Child Centers are part of a statewide network of centers that offer a range of services for children and families, including several Head Start programs. In St. Johnsbury, the Head Start program has collaborated with Catamount Arts for art and music. In 2019, The Caledonian-Record published an interview with Joy Ely, the director of the St. Johnsbury Parent Child Center, about the "unique" array of services available and "the biggest misconception is that community members must meet certain income criteria to be involved."

=== Youth and Young Adults ===
NEKCA's Community Action Youth Services (CAYS) offers "wrap around" services to youth age 12 - 22, including a crisis hotline, support for basic needs, education, jobs, and mentoring. Services also include homelessness and foster care transition services, a crisis intervention program for runaways age 12 - 18, a Teen Center in Newport, VT, and education support for pregnant and parenting teens and young adults of all genders.

A video produced by NEKCA in 2013 is featured on the U.S. Department of Health and Human Services Child Welfare Information Gateway, and in 2018, NEKCA was featured as part of a 'success story' published by the Family and Youth Services Bureau (FYSB) of the U.S. Department of Health and Human Services.

=== Micro Business Development Program ===
NEKCA offers technical assistance, learning opportunities, tax assistance (VITA), and funding opportunities to eligible participants who intend to start or expand a small business.

In 2020, NEKCA administered CARES Act grants to small businesses in the region. In January 2020, The Associated Press reported that NEKCA was part of a coalition of local groups that launched NEK Prosper! and a funding program to support small businesses.

=== Community and Justice Programs ===
In Vermont, Court Diversion programs are run by non-profit agencies and are funded by Vermont's Attorney General.

In Orleans County, NEKCA works with the Vermont Department of Corrections and the Vermont Department for Children and Families to administer a Community Based Corrections Program to support transition from incarceration, a Court Diversion program as an alternative to incarceration, a Youth Substance Abuse Safety Program, a Driving with License Suspended Program for eligible participants, a Pre-Trial Risk Assessment and Needs Screening program, and a Balanced & Restorative Justice program (BARJ) for youth on probation.

=== Thrift Store ===
The NEKCA Parent Child Center Thrift Store offers job training and work experience, and affordable clothing, household goods, and furniture.

== Fundraising and Outreach ==
For more than ten years, there has been a yearly Hungerfest fundraiser to support NEKCA's Food Shelf program that has evolved over time and includes a variety of events. In the past, two radio stations, WMOO and WIKE, held a three-day, 24-hour, on-air Hungerfest fundraiser.

Northeast Kingdom Community Action has also worked to increase public awareness about homelessness.

== Awards and honors ==
- In 2016, NEKCA Executive Director Joe Patrissi was awarded a Restorative Justice Leadership Award from the Community Justice Network of Vermont
- In 2018, NEKCA was awarded the Creative Workforce Solutions’ 2017 fourth quarter Business of the Quarter Award
- 2019-2020 Women LEAD Calendar Participant (NEKCA Executive Director Jenna O'Farrell)
- In 2020, NEKCA received a Community Leadership Award from the Green Mountain United Way

== History ==
In the past, NEKCA provided advocacy and support services, including 24-hour support to survivors of domestic and sexual violence and abuse, through its Step O.N.E. program. In 2007, questions were anonymously raised about confidentiality and appropriations, but the NEKCA Executive Director at the time, Paul Denton, speculated it was a disgruntled former employee, and confirmed that while employees had been terminated or suspended, full services continued to be provided with strict confidentiality. Advocacy and support services in the Northeast Kingdom, including 24-hour support for survivors of domestic and sexual violence and abuse, stalking, teen dating violence, human trafficking as well as violence related to gender or sexual orientation, are now provided by the nonprofit organization Umbrella.

In 2009, after NEKCA was unanimously approved by the St. Johnsbury Development Review Board to create transitional housing for furloughees from prison, The Caledonian-Record published an opinion expressing concerns. In 2011, NEKCA Executive Director Joe Patrissi announced a new approach to transitional housing for furloughees, including by contacting officials in town governments before developing housing plans.

In 2009, the Rutland Herald profiled Bernie Henault, who worked as the Essex County coordinator for NEKCA for 18 years. In September 2012, The Caledonian-Record published a series of articles on poverty and cash welfare benefits in the Northeast Kingdom, including a profile of NEKCA and interviews with NEKCA employees that was republished in an edited form by VTDigger.
