= Northeast Kingdom =

Coordinates: 44.64°N 72.04°W

- Area
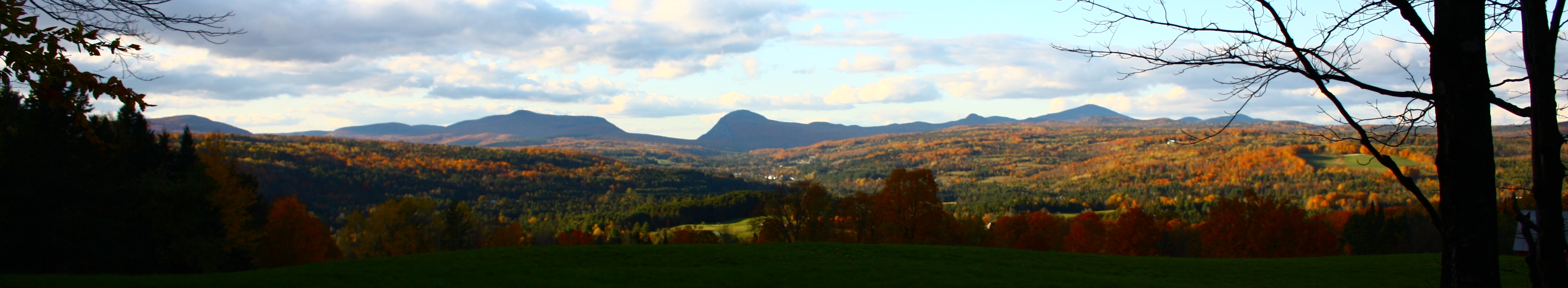
- Panoramic view of Willoughby Notch and Mount Pisgah

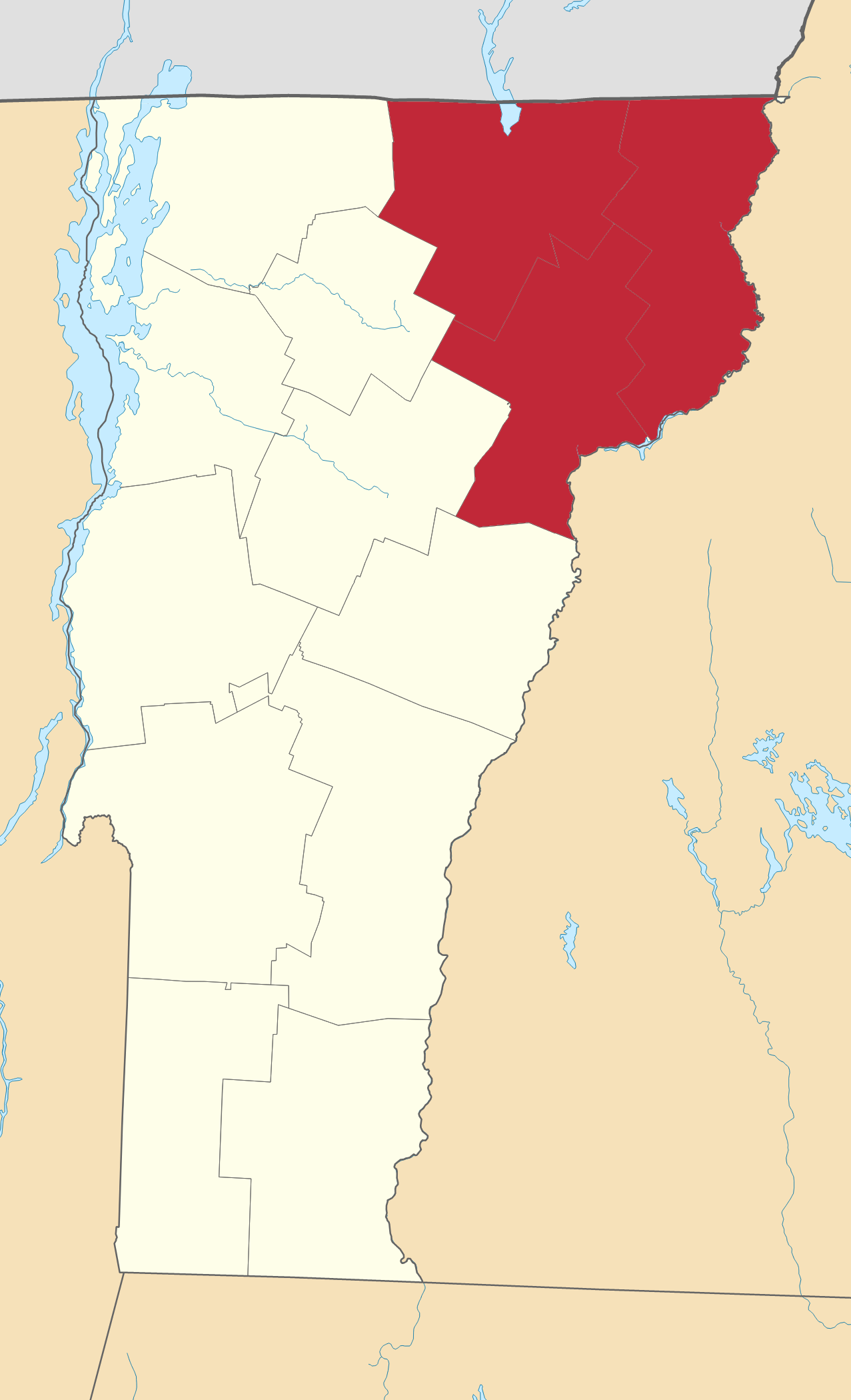
- Map of the Northeast Kingdom within Vermont
- Country: United States
- State: Vermont

Area
  - Total: 5,250 km^{2} (2,030 sq mi)

Population (2020)
  - Total: 63,546
  - Density: 12.1/km^{2} (31.3/sq mi)

The Northeast Kingdom (also, locally, "The Kingdom" and abbreviated NEK) is the northeast corner of the U.S. state of Vermont. Its borders are the subject of some debate, but the region is usually taken to comprise Essex, Orleans, and Caledonia counties, which collectively had a population of 63,546 at the 2020 United States census. The term "Northeast Kingdom" is attributed to George D. Aiken, former Governor of Vermont and a U.S. senator, who first used the term in a 1949 speech.

The region includes several "gateway" towns, considered to be entry points from a particular direction: at the southeastern corner, St. Johnsbury, just a few miles from the New Hampshire border; to the north, Newport and Derby, close to the Canada–US border; to the northeast, Canaan; and to the southwest, Hardwick. Another town that has used the term "gateway to the Northeast Kingdom" is Lyndonville although it is not at any of the region's borders.

Interstate 91, Interstate 93, U.S. Route 5, and U.S. Route 2 are the main roads that connect travelers to the Northeast Kingdom.

== Geography ==
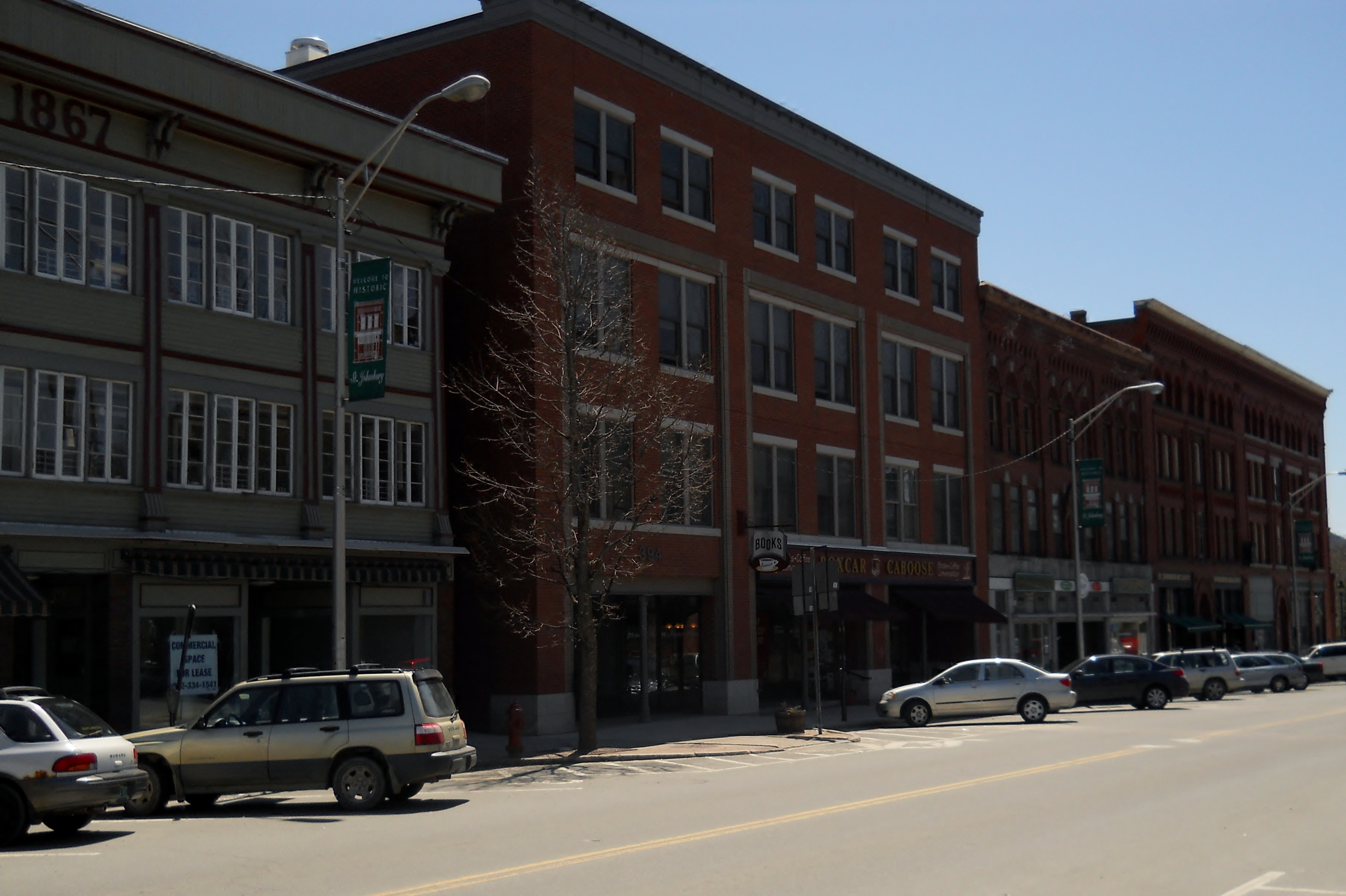
Railroad Street in downtown St. Johnsbury in 2011

The Northeast Kingdom is bordered on the east by the Connecticut River and on the west by the Green Mountains. The highest point is Jay Peak, a summit on the main ridge of the Green Mountains, at 3,858 feet (1,176 m). The highest point outside of the Green Mountains is East Mountain in East Haven, with a summit elevation of 3,439 feet (1,048 m). Another notable high point is Monadnock Mountain, because it is a relatively isolated peak with a maintained climbing trail.

The Kingdom encompasses 55 towns and gores, with a land area of 2,027 square miles (5,250 km^{2}), about 21% of the state of Vermont. The city of Newport is the only incorporated city in the tri-county area.

As of 1997, 80% of the Northeast Kingdom was covered by forest; 59% was northern hardwood, 29% spruce or fir.

The Northeast Kingdom has been listed in the North American and international editions of 1,000 Places to See Before You Die by Patricia Schultz.

The largest municipalities in the Northeast Kingdom are the towns of St. Johnsbury (population 7,603), Lyndon (5,981), and Derby (4,621), and the city of Newport (4,589).

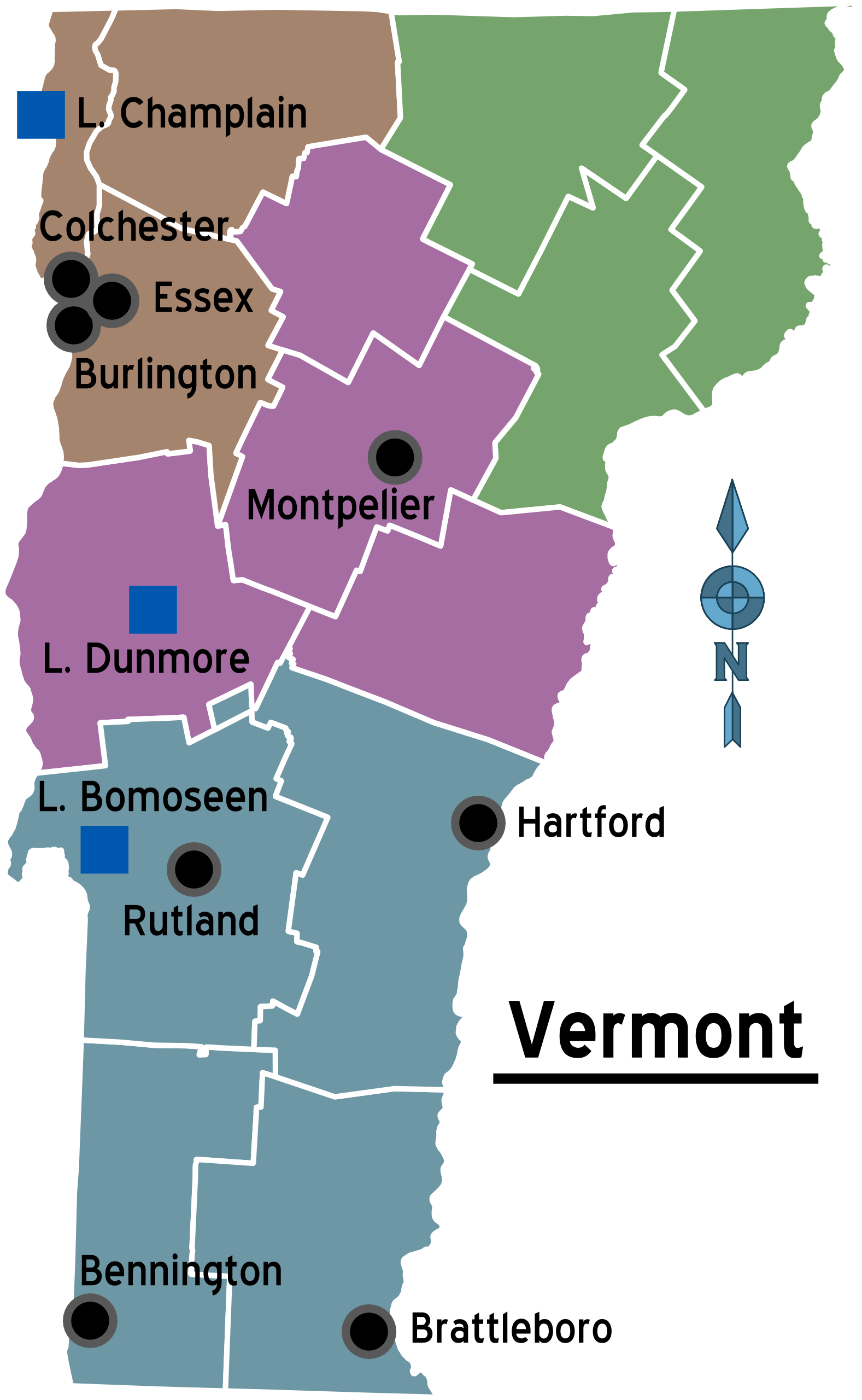
Map of Vermont Regions, with three green counties that are the Northeast Kingdom.

=== Geology ===
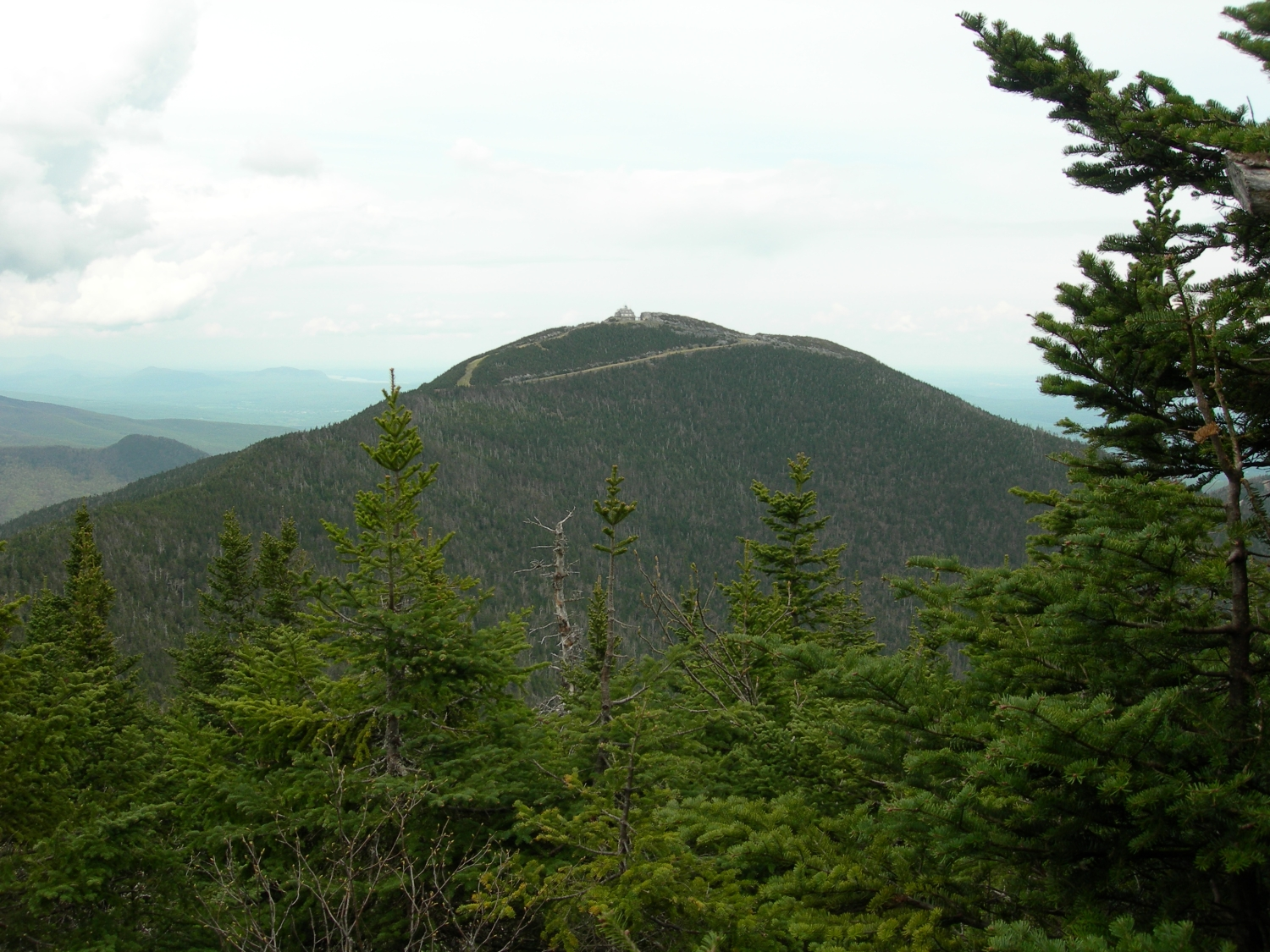
Jay Peak seen from Big Jay

Although Vermont is known as the Green Mountain State, the Northeast Kingdom lies outside that geological formation and is based on a set of long-ago volcanic islands, compressed during collision with the Taconic orogeny. Views and vistas differ sharply from those of the state's central mountain spine.

The presence of kame terraces in the counties are of interest in connection with the glacial drift that gave the Northeast Kingdom its soil and its surface stones and boulders. These terraces have beds of sand and clay from which bricks were once manufactured.

Two land masses collided at the end of the Ordovician Period about 466 million years ago. This collision first formed what are now the Green Mountains which extend into the westernmost part of the Northeast Kingdom. It also created great pressure within the earth, resulting in active volcanoes. The resultant eruptions produced igneous rock which became the granite found in many of the region's mountains and in the Connecticut River Valley.

The remaining geology was created during the Silurian–Devonian Period, about 400 million years ago, and left behind slate, with some granite, schist, and limestone.

An expansion of the polar glaciers resulted in an ice age which greatly affected the geology. A 1-mile-thick (1,600 m) sheet of ice covered the Kingdom several times, over one million years, until 13,500 years ago. It brought the many boulders seen in the area and created many prominent features, including Lake Memphremagog, Lake Willoughby, and Crystal Lake.

The retreat of the Laurentide glacier allowed the Green Mountains again to arise, but much eroded. A saltwater incursion resulting in the Champlain Sea from the Atlantic Ocean covered much of Vermont, including what is now Lake Memphremagog. This incursion stopped 11,000 years ago and became fresh water. Forests later appeared after the water receded.

=== Flora ===
According to the A. W. Kuchler U.S. potential natural vegetation types, the Northeast Kingdom would have four dominant vegetation types and forms listed below from highest to lowest elevation.

1. A dominant vegetation type of Northeastern Spruce/Fir (96) with a dominant vegetation form of Northern Conifer Forest (22).
2. A dominant vegetation type of Northern Hardwoods/Spruce (108) with a dominant vegetation form of Northern Hardwoods (23).
3. A dominant vegetation type of Northern Hardwoods (106) with a dominant vegetation form of Northern Hardwoods (23).
4. Transitional dominant vegetation types of Northern Hardwoods (106) and Appalachian Oak (104) with transitional vegetation forms of Northern Hardwoods (23) and Eastern Hardwood Forest (25).

The plant hardiness zone at Island Pond is 3b with an average annual extreme minimum air temperature of −31.8 °F (−35.4 °C). The spring bloom typically peaks around May 13 and fall color usually peaks around September 30.

=== Fauna ===
In 1996, the moose population totalled 2,000, about 1.75/mi² (0.676/km²). In 2005, the population was 5,000; 3.4/mi² (1.313/km²). State officials determined that the herd had become stressed due to overpopulation, and that the 1996 figure was more desirable. As a result, 1,260 hunting permits were issued in 2008 to cull the herd. In 2009, state officials aimed for one moose per 1 square mile (2.6 km^{2}).

There are also black bear, deer, bobcat, coyote, fox, fisher, loon, wild turkey, and ruffed grouse.

In 2013, Canadian lynxes were spotted. These prey on the snowshoe hare.

Martens, extinct in Vermont by the early 20th century, have found their way back to the Northeast Kingdom in small groups in the 21st century from New Hampshire or Canada.

The Virginia opossum moved into the area in the 1950s.

The Northeast Kingdom also hosts a mythological creature in Lake Memphremagog, which straddles the Canada border at Newport, Vermont. The creature is called Memphre and ostensibly is serpent-like.

=== Climate ===
According to the Köppen climate classification system, the Northeast Kingdom has a Warm-summer, Humid continental climate (Dfb). Dfb climates are characterized by a least one month having an average mean temperature ≤ 32.0 °F (0.0 °C), at least four months with an average mean temperature ≥ 50.0 °F (10.0 °C), all months with an average mean temperature < 71.6 °F (22.0 °C) and no significant precipitation difference between seasons. Although most summer days are comfortably humid in the Northeast Kingdom, episodes of warmth and moderate humidity can occur with heat index values > 88 °F (31 °C). Since 1981, the highest air temperature at Island Pond was 91.0 °F (32.8 °C) on 07/08/1988, and the highest daily average mean dew point was 70.0 °F (21.1 °C) on 07/02/2018. Since 1981, the wettest calendar day was 3.67 inches (93 mm) on 08/28/2011. During the winter months, the average annual extreme minimum air temperature is −31.8 °F (−35.4 °C). Since 1981, the coldest air temperature at Island Pond was −40.7 °F (−40.4 °C) on 01/04/1981. Episodes of extreme cold and wind can occur with wind chill values < −48 °F (−44 °C).

The average growing season is about 123-130 frost-free days.

On December 30, 1933, the lowest recorded temperature in the New England states was registered as −50.8 °F (−46.0 °C), at Bloomfield in Essex County.

Snowfall is plentiful in the region, and very large snowstorms occur every few years. These have included the 2007 Valentine's Day Blizzard, which brought 21.1 inches (540 mm) to the area over a two-day period. This was nearly matched on March 6, 2011, when the area received 20.3 inches (520 mm) of snow. This snow fall variable was matched again on two separate occasions in 2017, with 18-24" of new snow covering the area exactly a month apart. Both storms also severely affected the rest of New England and Upstate New York.

Climate data for Island Pond, Elevation 1,214 ft (370 m), 1981-2010 normals, extremes 1981-2018
Month	Jan	Feb	Mar	Apr	May	Jun	Jul	Aug	Sep	Oct	Nov	Dec	Year
Record high °F (°C)	58.7 (14.8)	63.2 (17.3)	75.7 (24.3)	83.5 (28.6)	85.9 (29.9)	90.7 (32.6)	91.0 (32.8)	89.6 (32.0)	89.3 (31.8)	76.8 (24.9)	66.9 (19.4)	59.8 (15.4)	91.0 (32.8)
Mean daily maximum °F (°C)	23.0 (−5.0)	27.4 (−2.6)	36.4 (2.4)	50.5 (10.3)	63.7 (17.6)	72.3 (22.4)	76.3 (24.6)	74.8 (23.8)	66.7 (19.3)	54.0 (12.2)	41.0 (5.0)	29.0 (−1.7)	51.4 (10.8)
Daily mean °F (°C)	12.1 (−11.1)	15.1 (−9.4)	25.1 (−3.8)	39.3 (4.1)	51.3 (10.7)	60.5 (15.8)	64.8 (18.2)	63.4 (17.4)	55.3 (12.9)	43.7 (6.5)	33.0 (0.6)	19.9 (−6.7)	40.4 (4.7)
Mean daily minimum °F (°C)	1.2 (−17.1)	2.9 (−16.2)	13.8 (−10.1)	28.2 (−2.1)	38.9 (3.8)	48.7 (9.3)	53.3 (11.8)	52.1 (11.2)	43.9 (6.6)	33.5 (0.8)	25.0 (−3.9)	10.8 (−11.8)	29.5 (−1.4)
Record low °F (°C)	−36.6 (−38.1)	−40.7 (−40.4)	−29.7 (−34.3)	−2.5 (−19.2)	19.7 (−6.8)	27.0 (−2.8)	32.4 (0.2)	32.2 (0.1)	22.5 (−5.3)	14.9 (−9.5)	−9.4 (−23.0)	−27.8 (−33.2)	−40.7 (−40.4)
Average precipitation inches (mm)	2.76 (70)	2.20 (56)	2.67 (68)	3.04 (77)	3.93 (100)	4.76 (121)	4.80 (122)	4.58 (116)	4.06 (103)	4.32 (110)	3.87 (98)	3.14 (80)	44.13 (1,121)
Average snowfall inches (cm)	26.8 (68)	24.6 (62)	23.2 (59)	5.7 (14)	0.4 (1.0)	0.0 (0.0)	0.0 (0.0)	0.0 (0.0)	0.0 (0.0)	1.7 (4.3)	8.2 (21)	26.8 (68)	117.4 (298)
Average relative humidity (%)	81.0	76.7	68.5	61.8	61.9	68.0	71.3	71.7	74.1	73.8	77.7	79.6	72.2
Average dew point °F (°C)	7.4 (−13.7)	9.1 (−12.7)	16.2 (−8.8)	27.3 (−2.6)	38.7 (3.7)	49.9 (9.9)	55.3 (12.9)	54.1 (12.3)	47.2 (8.4)	35.9 (2.2)	26.8 (−2.9)	14.6 (−9.7)	32.0 (0.0)
Source: PRISM

== History ==
=== Early human history ===
The retreating glacier allowed the northern migration of early humans around 9300 BCE, descendants of Asian immigrants during the Ice Age. By 7300 BCE, people and a changing environment had eliminated large game from the area such as caribou and mastodons.

From 1000 BCE to 1600 CE, Abenakis inhabited the Kingdom.

Perhaps as many as a thousand Cowasuck Indians lived in Essex County near the Connecticut River in 1500. This tribe included all people from the Cahass, Cohassiac, Coos, Coosuc, and Koes tribes. The Cowasucks were Abenakis, members of the Wabanaki Confederacy, the Algonquian pact of five tribes which banded together to combat Iroquois aggression perhaps about 1500, though the exact date of the Iroquois pact is unknown.

European diseases, such as typhus, contracted from exposure to traders, killed many of the Cowasucks until only a few hundred were left in the Northeast Kingdom by 1600.

=== Modern history ===
The Northeast Kingdom's popularity as a destination grew strongly from the moment that Governor George Aiken delivered a name for the region in 1949. Vermont Public Radio reporter Charlotte Albright researched the naming process and wrote, "The novelist Howard Frank Mosher, who immortalizes the area in his fictional "Kingdom County," believes Aiken cooked up the phrase while fishing in Essex County." Aiken and his wife Lola were surprised at how strongly the term caught on.

Patent medicines were popular here, as in other rural regions, in the late 19th century. The local pharmacists who devised these "cures" gradually metamorphosed into today's pharmacies, and in the Northeast Kingdom they are still businesses where residents are often recognized and greeted by name. Similarly, the area's "country doctors" are now affiliated with two regional hospitals (North Country Hospital in Newport, and Northeastern Vermont Regional Hospital in St. Johnsbury), as well as the Dartmouth-Hitchcock network.

There were about 49 "town dumps" where residents disposed of trash, operating in the NEK prior to 1987. After the state began regulating the environment in 1987, 41 of these closed down, including the one at what is now Gardner Park in Newport. Seven of the remainder closed during subsequent state regulatory activity. Only the one in Coventry, owned by Charlie Nadeau, remained. The Parker landfill in Lyndonville closed, as did the ones in Barton, Morrisville, Colebrook, Morgan, Westmore, and Lunenburg.

In 2010, Yankee magazine named the NEK the second favorite romantic getaway and the third favorite family getaway in New England.

In 2015, the region featured half a dozen local radio stations, as well as regional versions of Vermont Public Radio (FM88.5 broadcast from Burke Mountain) and Montpelier's The Point; popular are Magic 97.7 FM broadcast from Lyndonville, and MOO (WMOO) at 92.1FM from Derby Center, Vermont.

== Demographics ==
In all three counties, estimated population dropped between 2010 and 2012 by about 200 people. State population declined slightly as well.

== Government ==
As in the rest of New England, there is a strong state government. Town government often uses unpaid volunteers for its services. There is a superficial county government, all funded by the state. The counties have sheriffs, judges, prosecutors, and other officers; all, except for judges, elected by the county, but funded by the state.

Recognizing the need for services on an intermediate level, state legislation created the Regional Planning Commissions (RPC), to aid the towns in land use issues, and Economic Development Commissions (EDC), tasked with fostering economic development in their jurisdictions. These RPCs and EDCs report to the Vermont Agency of Commerce and Community Development. They must also report to their boards, which are made up of representatives of each town in the commission. As with some state agencies there is provision for these commissions to also organize as nonprofit groups, yet still maintain status as government agencies. This method of organization permits RPCs and EDCs to augment their state and federal funding with other sources of income. This arrangement also allows the EDCs to own properties such as industrial parks and Business Incubator Facilities.

RPCs and EDCs have no taxing or regulatory authority. However, RPCs do write a regional plan (as towns can have town plans). Town plans can not run contrary to the regional plans. RPCs also have automatic party status to any ACT 250 applications. ACT 250 permits are the state's Land Use Permit issued by the Land Use Panel of the Vermont Natural Resources Board. ACT 250 applications must be in compliance with the RPC's Regional Plan. A copy of all ACT 250 permit applications must be submitted (by the applicants) to the RPCs for review.

The Northeast Kingdom is unique, as it benefits from an agency that is both an Economic Development Commission as well as a Regional Planning Commission, the Northeastern Vermont Development Association and Regional Planning Commission (NVDA). Under a state legislators' study to lower state government spending, lawmakers have been looking to the Northeast Kingdom's RPC/EDC as a model for possible consolidation of agencies throughout the state.

Municipalities are governed by an elected Board of Selectmen and managed by an elected town or city clerk.

== Public health ==
Various organizations are tasked with aiding public health including the Northeast Kingdom Human Services.

The Kingdom is part of a Rural Economic Area Partnership which the federal government funds. This may pay for improvements in health and safety.

== Economy ==
=== Farming ===
In 2010 the largest dairy farmer in the state was in Orleans County with 5,000 head and 2,500 milkers, spread over five farms.

Maple syrup is produced in the region.

=== Tourism ===
The area offers mountain biking, skiing, and fall foliage viewing. A rail trail across the southern part of the Kingdom originates in St. Johnsbury on South Main Street as part of the Lamoille Valley Rail Trail; in the north, the Kingdom Heritage Lands feature multiple use access, including hiking, bicycling, and hunting; and in the center of the Kingdom, radiating outward from Burke Mountain, are hundreds of acres threaded with well-kept trails provided via Kingdom Trails of East Burke.

=== NGOs ===
There are a number of non-profit, non-governmental agencies, that either offer services or promote business or housing. These include the Northern Community Investment Corporation, based in St. Johnsbury; Rural Edge, formerly known as the Gilman Housing Trust; the Lyndon Outing Club, an all-volunteer-run ski hill providing affordable skiing to the community since 1937; and The Kingdom Trail Association, which builds and maintains the non-motorized recreational trail network in Burke.

== Infrastructure ==
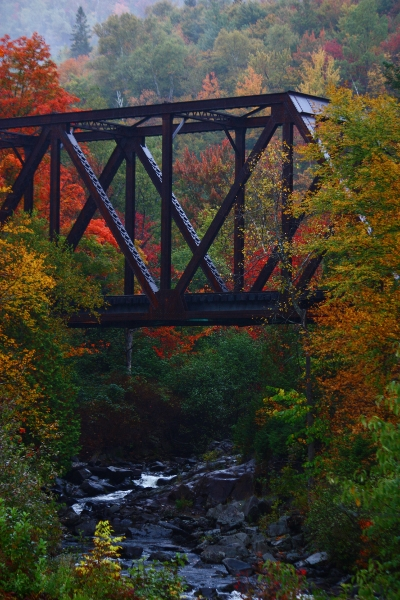
The "Iron Bridge" in Brighton, just north of the village of Island Pond

In 2008, 74% of the roads were rated in poor or very poor condition. There were 480 bridges with spans of 20 feet (6.1 m) or more. There were a number of bridges deemed structurally deficient. 63 percent of those were municipally owned.

=== Railroads ===
Two railroads (freight only) traverse the Northeast Kingdom:

- Washington County Railroad (part of the Vermont Rail System) - in 2016 WACR was awarded a 30-year contract to operate the track running from White River Junction north through St. Johnsbury and Newport. Most of the track through the Kingdom meets FRA Class 2 standards, 25 miles per hour (40 km/h) for freight movement; 30 miles per hour (48 km/h) for passengers.
- The St. Lawrence and Atlantic Railroad operates six trains a day between Island Pond and Maine, and four trips a day between Island Pond and Canada. Lumber is the principal freight.

The St. Johnsbury and Lamoille County Railroad operated an east-west route terminating in St. Johnsbury from the 1880s to the 1990s, under varying names. Much of the right-of-way is now the Lamoille Valley Rail Trail.

The Hardwick and Woodbury Railroad operated a short line hauling granite from 1897 to 1934. Its right-of-way is being converted to a rail trail.

=== Bus ===
Rural Community Transportation runs out of Saint Johnsbury and serves Caledonia, Essex, Lamoille, and Orleans counties.

=== Airports ===
There are three state airports: Northeast Kingdom International Airport (KEFK) in Newport/Coventry, Caledonia County State Airport (KCDA) in Lyndonville; and John H. Boylan State Airport (5B1) in Island Pond. Light private and business aircraft land there. KEFK has two runways, its long 5,300 ft (1,600 m) runway allows for jet operations. KEFK is served by U.S. Customs as a designated Landing Rights Airport.

=== Solid waste disposal ===
The Northeast Kingdom Waste and Central Vermont Solid Management Districts are in charge of implementing Vermont's Act 148, initiating mandatory recycling. In 2014, the NEK recycled about 20%, low for the state which averages 30–36%. Recycling rates in the Central Vermont District meet the state average. An average citizen here produces 2 pounds (0.91 kg) of trash per person per day, compared to 3 pounds (1.4 kg) for the rest of the state. The budget for the 2016 calendar year was $716,673. Towns or haulers were charged $23.25 per ton. The Kingdom produced about half the national average of trash. This is the result of lower incomes and fewer places to shop.

== In popular culture ==
The Northeast Kingdom is the inspiration for Howard Frank Mosher's fictional Kingdom County, the setting of many of his works.

Peacham was used as the filming location for the 1993 movie Ethan Frome, based on the novel of the same name. The 1996 film The Spitfire Grill was largely shot in Peacham, and the waterfall scene shot at Big Falls over the Mississquoi River in Troy.

Robert Frost wrote a poem with the Kingdom as its topic entitled "A Servant to Servants".

Several of Archer Mayor's books in the Joe Gunther series based on a Vermont detective are set in the Northeast Kingdom.

Chris Bohjalian's novel Midwives places most of its action in the Northeast Kingdom.

== Media ==
=== Newspapers and magazines ===
- The Caledonian-Record, the area's largest newspaper, is published daily in St. Johnsbury.
- The Chronicle - published weekly in Barton
- The Newport Daily Express - published daily except Saturdays and Sundays in Newport. Owned by Horizon Publications out of Marion, IL. Printed in Canada
- The North Star Monthly - published monthly in Danville
- The Hardwick Gazette - published weekly in Hardwick
- Vermont's Northland Journal - published monthly in Derby

=== Radio ===
Sources:

- WSTJ - 1340 AM; St. Johnsbury - Standards
- WIKE - 1490 AM; Newport - Classic Rock (rebroadcasts WMTK Littleton, N.H.)
- W276DK - 103.1 FM; Newport - Rebroadcast of WIKE
- WVPA - 88.5 FM; St. Johnsbury - Vermont Public Radio
- WCKJ - 90.5 FM; St. Johnsbury - Religious - "The Light"
- WVLR-FM - 91.5 FM; Lyndonville - Vermont Public Co.
- WMOO - 92.1 FM; Derby Center - Hot Adult Contemporary - "Moo 92"
- WJSY-LP - 96.1 FM; Newport- Religious
- W243AE - 96.5 FM; Orleans - Religious - "The Light"
- WGMT - 97.7 FM; Lyndon- Hot Adult Contemporary - "Magic 97.7"
- W257AU - 99.3 FM; St. Johnsbury - Rebroadcast of WMOO
- WKXH - 105.5 FM; St. Johnsbury - Country - "Kix 105.5"
- WDOT - 95.7 FM; Danville - Adult Album Alternative - "The Point" (rebroadcasts WNCS/Montpelier)
- WVTI 106.9 FM broadcasts classical music from Island Pond, Vermont.

=== Television ===
The Northeast Kingdom is part of the Burlington / Plattsburgh television market. However, the use of cable and satellite to view television in the region is essential in many areas, due to the mountainous terrain between the region and most of the market's main television transmitters, many of them broadcasting from Mount Mansfield.

Many areas of the Northeast Kingdom receive cable television from either Comcast or Charter.

- UHF Channel 20, WVTB (PBS), St. Johnsbury, Vermont PBS
- Channel 14 W14CK Newport (programming unknown, last known as a rebroadcast of WWBI-LP)
- Cable Channel 7, KATV, Kingdom Access Television, Lyndonville, Public-access television cable TV

== See also ==
- Essex-Orleans (Vermont Senate district)
- Caledonia (Vermont Senate district)
