= WQJQ =

Former simulcast of WGMT, Lyndon, Vermont

Barton, Vermont; United States
- Broadcast area: Central Orleans County, Vermont
- Frequency: 100.3 MHz
- Branding: Magic 100.3

Programming
- Format: Adult contemporary

Ownership
- Owner: Michael Percy; (Capital Broadcasting Associates, LLC)
- Sister stations: WKXH, WMTK, WSTJ, WGMT

History
- First air date: September 2008; 17 years ago (as WJPK)
- Last air date: January 19, 2022; 4 years ago (date of license cancellation)
- Former call signs: WJPK (2008–2011); WJJZ (2011–2012)

Technical information
- Licensing authority: FCC
- Facility ID: 164279
- Class: A
- ERP: 100 watts
- HAAT: 160 meters (520 ft)
- Transmitter coordinates: 44°45′57.00″N 72°9′10.00″W

Links
- Public license information: Public file; LMS

WQJQ (100.3 FM, "Magic 100.3") was a 100-watt radio station broadcasting an adult contemporary music format simulcasting co-owned WGMT and was licensed to Barton, Vermont, United States. The station was owned by Michael Percy, through licensee Capital Broadcasting Associates, LLC.

== History ==
WJPK signed on in September 2008 as a simulcast of country-formatted WKXH 105.5 FM. In September 2009, the station changed to a simulcast of adult contemporary-formatted WGMT 97.7 FM, then to a bluegrass format in late 2012.

On December 1, 2011, WJPK changed its call letters to WJJZ and on August 16, 2012, changed the call letters to WQJQ. In November 2012, Vermont Broadcast Associates reached a deal to sell WQJQ to Michael Percy's Capital Broadcasting Associates. The sale, at a price of $25,000, was consummated on December 28, 2012.

WQJQ surrendered its license to the Federal Communications Commission on January 19, 2022. At the time of the shutdown, it had been simulcasting WGMT.
