= The Newport Daily Express =

Newspaper serving Newport, Vermont

- Front page of the June 2, 2020 edition
- Type: Daily newspaper
- Format: Broadsheet
- Owner(s): Horizon Publications
- Editor: Laura Carpenter
- Staff writers: 9
- Founded: 1936
- Language: English
- Headquarters: 178 Hill Street; Newport, Vermont 05855 United States
- Circulation: 3,000
- Website: newportvermontdailyexpress.com

The Newport Daily Express is a newspaper published weekdays in the city of Newport, Vermont.

== History ==
There were a number of predecessor papers that merged to form the Express.

W. G. Cambridge published the Newport Republican in 1864. He sold the paper to D. K. Simonds and Royal Cummings in 1865. They renamed the paper the Newport Express. Simonds became the editor. In 1866, Simonds sold his share to D. M. Camp who became editor. Camp purchased Cummings share in 1869 and became sole owner.

A. A. Earle published the Orleans Independent Standard in Irasburg from 1856 to 1869. He moved the paper to Barton and sold it to the Newport Express to form the Express and Standard.

There were various changes of editors and ownerships but by 1883, Camp again became sole owner and editor.

The paper retained this name until 1936.

In the 1980s, the circulation reached a high of 5,800.

The paper was later acquired by Scripps League Newspapers, which was acquired by Pulitzer in 1996. Hollinger bought the paper from Pulitzer the next year and sold it in 1999 to current owner Horizon Publications.

== Operations ==
Main competitors include The Chronicle, The Caledonian-Record, radio stations WIKE, WMOO, WJJZ (FM), and television station NEK-TV.

The paper grosses about $1 million annually.
