= WMTK =

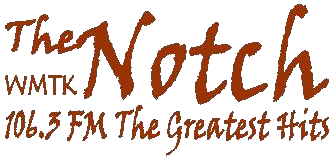
- Littleton, New Hampshire; United States
- Broadcast area: Northeast Kingdom; Grafton County, New Hampshire
- Frequency: 106.3 MHz
- Branding: 106.3 The Notch

Programming
- Format: Classic rock

Ownership
- Owner: Vermont Broadcast Associates, Inc.
- Operator: Green Mountain Broadcasters LLC

History
- First air date: August 1, 1985

Technical information
- Licensing authority: FCC
- Facility ID: 72212
- Class: A
- ERP: 390 watts
- HAAT: 383 meters (1,257 ft)
- Transmitter coordinates: 44.354°N 71.739°W

Links
- Public license information: Public file; LMS
- Webcast: Listen live
- Website: notchfm.com

WMTK (106.3 MHz; 106.3 The Notch) is a classic rock formatted station located in northern New Hampshire. It is licensed to Littleton, and is owned by the Vermont Broadcast Associates, Inc., along with WSTJ, WKXH, and WGMT. Programming is also simulcast on 1490/103.1 WIKE in Newport, Vermont. Under a local marketing agreement, Russ Ingalls' Green Mountain Broadcasters LLC operates the stations pending a full acquisition.

The station went on the air in 1985 as a country music station, later changing to the classic rock format.

== History ==
On August 1, 1985, WMTK became the first local commercial FM station to sign on in the North Country of New Hampshire and Northeast Kingdom of Vermont. The station began with a country music format, a local morning show, with local news and weather inserted throughout the day. The satellite country music service came from the Transtar Radio Networks, now Westwood One.

WMTK was never owned with Littleton's first radio station, WLTN (1400 AM), so Littleton had two stand-alone radio stations at the time, an unusual distinction for a town of its size. WMTK was known initially as "K 106.3", though over time became known as 106.3 WMTK. The studios were located at historic Thayer's Inn on Main Street.

For years, WMTK used to compete with both advertisers and listeners with St. Johnsbury's WNKV 105.5 FM (now Kix 105.5 WKXH). When WMTK and WNKV came under common ownership of Vermont Broadcast Associates (VBA), WMTK was flipped to a broad-based classic rock/classic hits variant that is still being programmed today. While still transmitting from Mann's Hill in Littleton, the studios were consolidated in the VBA broadcast building co-located with the WKXH and WSTJ studios on Concord Avenue in St. Johnsbury when Thayer's Inn needed the studio space for hotel purposes.

In February 2025, Bruce James agreed to sell the seven Vermont Broadcast Associates stations to Green Mountain Broadcasters, owned by Vermont state senator Russ Ingalls, for $996,000. Green Mountain then began managing the stations under a local marketing agreement.
