= National Register of Historic Places listings in Essex County, Vermont =

Location of Essex County in Vermont

This is a list of the National Register of Historic Places listings in Essex County, Vermont.

This is intended to be a complete list of the properties and districts on the National Register of Historic Places in Essex County, Vermont, United States. Latitude and longitude coordinates are provided for many National Register properties and districts; these locations may be seen together in a map.

There are 11 properties and districts listed on the National Register in the county.

This National Park Service list is complete through NPS recent listings posted March 21, 2025.

Contents: Counties in Vermont
Addison - Bennington - Caledonia - Chittenden - Essex - Franklin - Grand Isle - Lamoille - Orange - Orleans - Rutland - Washington - Windham - Windsor

== Current listings ==
	Name on the Register	Image	Date listed	Location	City or town	Description
1	Bloomfield-Nulhegan River Route 102 Bridge	Bloomfield-Nulhegan River Route 102 Bridge	November 14, 1991 (#91001605)	VT 102 over the Nulhegan River; 44°45′05″N 71°38′01″W	Bloomfield	
2	Columbia Covered Bridge	Columbia Covered Bridge	December 12, 1976 (#76000123)	Across the Connecticut River between U.S. Route 3 and VT 102; 44°51′12″N 71°33′05″W	Lemington	Extends into Coos County, New Hampshire
3	Guildhall Village Historic District	Guildhall Village Historic District	September 27, 1980 (#80000331)	VT 102; 44°33′56″N 71°33′46″W	Guildhall	
4	Judge David Hibbard Homestead	Judge David Hibbard Homestead	March 31, 1995 (#95000294)	Woodland Rd. 44°27′06″N 71°53′30″W	Concord	
5	Island Pond Historic District	Island Pond Historic District	January 31, 1979 (#79000275)	Junction of VT 105 and VT 114; 44°48′54″N 71°52′52″W	Island Pond	
6	Jacobs Stand	Jacobs Stand	June 3, 1980 (#80000332)	27 Park St. 44°59′45″N 71°32′23″W	Canaan	Now the Alice M. Ward Library.
7	Maidstone State Park	Maidstone State Park	November 29, 2001 (#01001285)	4858 and 4876 Maidstone Rd. 44°38′11″N 71°39′07″W	Maidstone	
8	Mount Orne Covered Bridge	Mount Orne Covered Bridge	December 12, 1976 (#76000124)	East of Lunenburg off Town Hwy 1; 44°27′38″N 71°39′12″W	Lunenburg	Extends into Coos County, New Hampshire
9	U.S. Inspection Station-Canaan, Vermont	U.S. Inspection Station-Canaan, Vermont	September 10, 2014 (#14000601)	387 VT 141; 45°00′43″N 71°33′36″W	Canaan	
10	U.S. Inspection Station-Beecher Falls, Vermont	U.S. Inspection Station-Beecher Falls, Vermont	September 10, 2014 (#14000602)	1429 VT 253; 45°00′46″N 71°30′22″W	Canaan	
11	U.S. Inspection Station-Norton, Vermont	U.S. Inspection Station-Norton, Vermont	September 10, 2014 (#14000603)	115 VT 147N; 45°00′37″N 71°47′39″W	Norton	

== See also ==
- List of National Historic Landmarks in Vermont
- National Register of Historic Places listings in Vermont
