= WJJZ =

WJJZ may refer to:

- WJJZ (FM), a radio station (94.5 FM) licensed to serve Irasburg, Vermont, United States
- WQJQ, a defunct radio station (100.3 FM) formerly licensed to serve Barton, Vermont, which held the call sign WJJZ from 2011 to 2012
- WPEN (FM), a radio station (97.5 FM) licensed to serve Burlington, New Jersey, United States, which held the call sign WJJZ from 2006 to 2008
- WUMR (FM), a radio station (106.1 FM) licensed to Philadelphia, Pennsylvania, United States, which held the call sign WJJZ from 1993 to 2006
- WJJZ (AM), the call sign of two former radio stations (1460 AM) licensed to serve Mount Holly, New Jersey, United States, between 1963 and 1983
