= WNKV =

WNKV may refer to:

- WNKV (FM), a radio station (103.5 FM) licensed to Burgettstown, Pennsylvania, United States
- WRNV, a radio station (91.1 FM) licensed to Norco, Louisiana, United States, which held the call sign WNKV from 2006 to 2025
- WKXH, a radio station (105.5 FM) licensed to St. Johnsbury, Vermont, United States, which held the call sign WNKV from 1985 to 1998
