= Bloomfield-Nulhegan River Route 102 Bridge =

- U.S. National Register of Historic Places
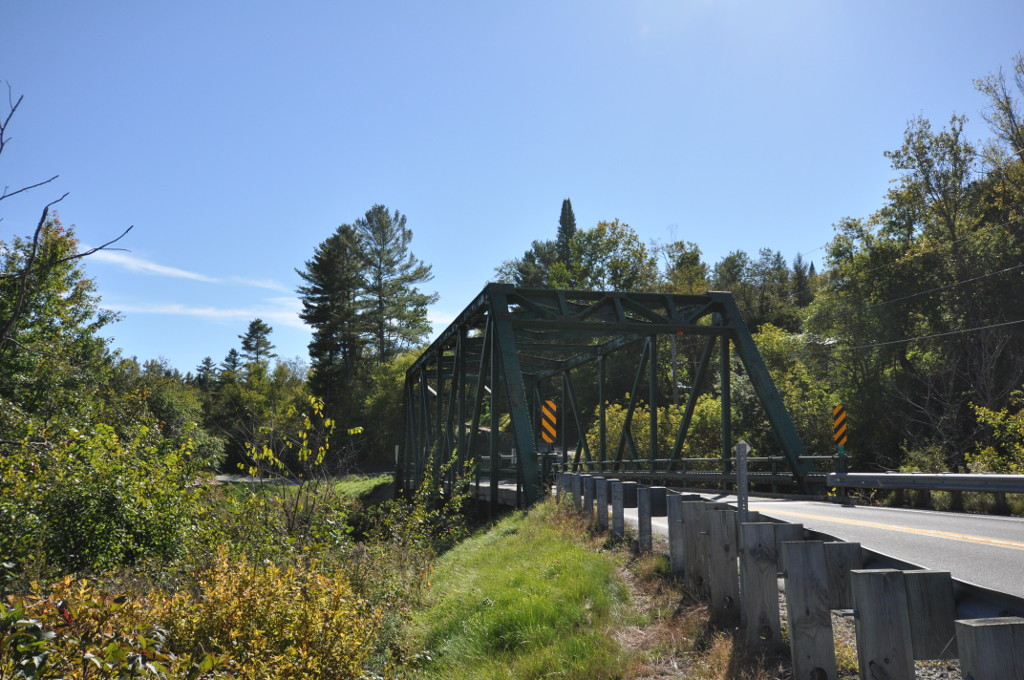

- Location within Vermont Location within the United States
- Location: VT 102 over the Nulhegan R., Bloomfield, Vermont
- Coordinates: 44°45′5″N 71°38′1″W
- Area: less than one acre
- Built: 1937
- Architectural style: Pratt through truss
- MPS: Metal Truss, Masonry, and Concrete Bridges in Vermont MPS
- NRHP reference No.: 91001605
- Added to NRHP: November 14, 1991

The Bloomfield-Nulhegan River Route 102 Bridge is a historic bridge in Bloomfield, Vermont. It carries Vermont Route 102 over the Nulhegan River, near its mouth at the Connecticut River just south of Bloomfield Village. Built in 1937, it is a well-preserved example of a Pratt through truss, exhibiting then state-of-the-art engineering. It was listed on the National Register of Historic Places in 1991.

== Description and history ==
Vermont Route 102 crosses the Nulhegan River just south of the village center and west of the Connecticut River. The bridge carrying the highway is a six-panel single-span steel Pratt through truss bridge, resting on concrete abutments. Its length is 134 feet (41 m) and its width is 24 feet (7.3 m), with a portal clearance height of 15 feet (4.6 m). It stands about 10 feet (3.0 m) above the river and carries two lanes of traffic. The trusses are formed out of rolled I-beams that were assembled on site using hydraulic riveting, a technology introduced in the 1920s. The decking consists of pavement laid on concrete over I-beams that are mounted on the truss bottom chords and riveted to their vertical elements.

The bridge was built in 1937, and was built using standards and technologies introduced by the state during a bridge-building program introduced after a major flooding event in the state in 1927. It is a well-preserved example of a Pratt truss of the period, and the riveting technology enabled the bridge to be fabricated on site, rather than shipping the trusses from a factory.

== See also ==
- National Register of Historic Places listings in Essex County, Vermont
- List of bridges on the National Register of Historic Places in Vermont
