= NKHS =

NKHS may refer to:

- Northeast Kingdom Human Services, a social services contractor in Northeast Kingdom, Vermont, United States

== Schools ==
- New Kent High School, New Kent, Virginia, United States
- North Kingstown High School, North Kingstown, Rhode Island, United States
- North Knox High School, Bicknell, Indiana, United States
