= Judge David Hibbard Homestead =

Historic house in Vermont, United States

- U.S. National Register of Historic Places
- U.S. Historic district
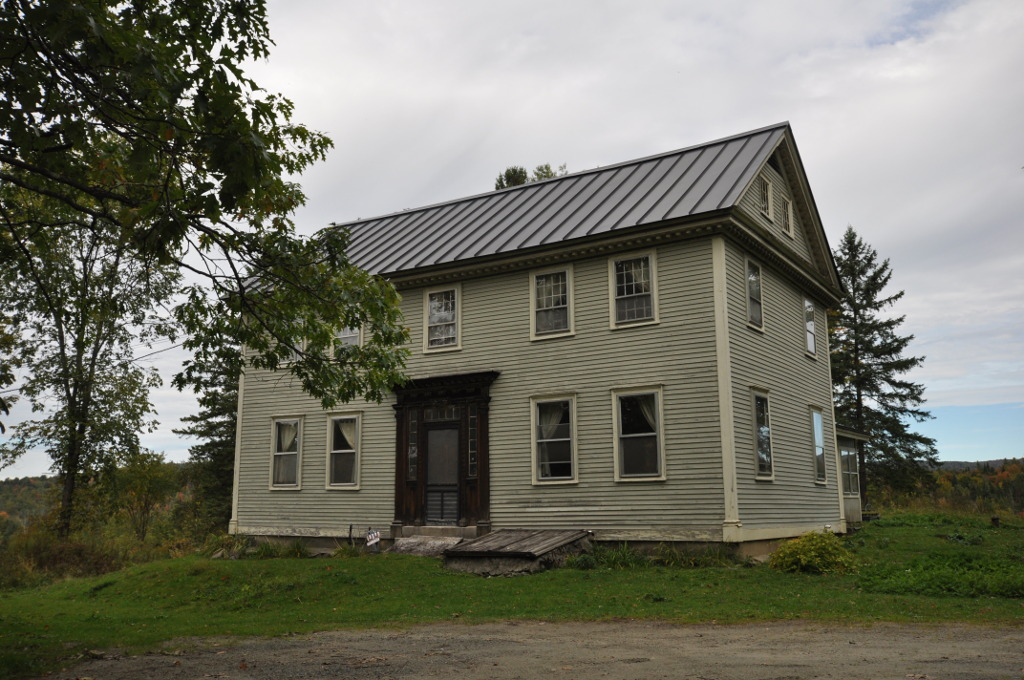

- Location within Vermont Location within the United States
- Location: Woodland Rd., Concord, Vermont
- Coordinates: 44°26′56″N 71°53′40″W
- Area: 160 acres (65 ha)
- Built: 1814
- Architectural style: Federal
- NRHP reference No.: 95000294
- Added to NRHP: March 31, 1995

The Judge David Hibbard Homestead is a historic farm property on Woodland Road in Concord, Vermont. The farmhouse, built in 1814 for a prominent local lawyer, is one of the finest examples of Federal period architecture in northeastern Vermont. It was listed on the National Register of Historic Places in 1995.

== Description and history ==
The Hibbard homestead stands in a rural area of Concord, at the northern end of Woodland Road. The property consists of 160 acres (65 ha), or which more than 100 acres are woodland, and the balance consists of formerly agricultural rolling fields. The farmstead, set among the fields, includes the 1814 farmhouse, a mid-19th century barn, and several 20th-century outbuildings. The farmhouse is a 2 1/2-story wood-frame structure, with a side-gable roof, reproduction period clapboard siding, and a dressed granite foundation. The building corners have narrow carved pilasters, and the cornice features finely detailed hand-carved woodwork. The main facade is five bays wide, with the entrance at the center. It has an elaborate surround, with sidelight windows flanked by pilasters, and a corniced header with elaborate carved woodwork fastened by either wooden pegs or hand-cut nails. An older (c. 1805) ell extends to the rear of the main block. The interior retains many original carved wooden finish elements.

David Hibbard, Jr. was the son of one of Concord's first settlers. He acquired this land in the early 19th century, building what was little more than a log cabin on it about 1805. This became the kitchen ell to what is now the main house, which was built in 1814. The carvings were supposedly executed by an itinerant craftsman who spent two years on the property. Hibbard was a self-taught lawyer and farmer, and succeeded his father as one of the town's leading citizens. The property was sold out of the Hibbard family in the late 1850s.

== See also ==
- National Register of Historic Places listings in Essex County, Vermont
