= WJJZ (FM) =

Coordinates: 44.81494°N 72.2393°W

- Irasburg, Vermont; United States
- Broadcast area: Orleans County, Vermont
- Frequency: 94.5 MHz
- Branding: JJ Country

Programming
- Format: Country
- Network: CBS News Radio

Ownership
- Owner: Bruce James; (Vermont Broadcast Associates, Inc.)
- Operator: Green Mountain Broadcasters LLC
- Sister stations: WIKE, WMOO

History
- First air date: October 2014

Technical information
- Licensing authority: FCC
- Class: A
- ERP: 6,000 watts
- HAAT: 30.1 meters (99 ft)

Links
- Public license information: Public file; LMS
- Website: jjcountry.com

WJJZ (94.5 FM) is a commercial radio station licensed to Irasburg, Vermont, United States. It is owned by Vermont Broadcast Associates, Inc., and airs a country music format. Vermont Broadcast Associates, whose principal owner is Bruce James, also owns WMOO in Derby Center and WIKE in Newport. All three stations have studios and offices on U.S. Route 5 in Derby. Under a local marketing agreement, Russ Ingalls' Green Mountain Broadcasters LLC operates the stations pending a full acquisition.

WJJZ's transmitter is sited off Guyette Road in Irasburg. It first signed on in 2014.

== History ==
After two years of work, WJJZ went on the air in October 2014 under the ownership of Bruce James' Vermont Broadcast Associates, broadcasting a country music format from the studios of WMOO and WIKE. It was the first FM country station in Orleans County; WJJZ's programming also included a weekend classic country show, a weekday trivia show, and CBS Radio News.

In February 2025, Bruce James agreed to sell the seven Vermont Broadcast Associates stations to Green Mountain Broadcasters, owned by Vermont state senator Russ Ingalls, for $996,000. Green Mountain then began managing the stations under a local marketing agreement.

The call sign WJJZ had previously been long associated with various radio stations in the Philadelphia, Pennsylvania, market, including two radio stations in Mount Holly, New Jersey, and two smooth jazz stations: WJJZ 106.1 from 1993 to 2006, and WJJZ 97.5 in New Jersey from 2006 to 2008.
