= WSTJ =

Radio station in St. Johnsbury, Vermont

- St. Johnsbury, Vermont; United States
- Broadcast area: Caledonia County, Vermont
- Frequency: 1340 kHz
- Branding: The Trail 104.1

Programming
- Format: Adult album alternative
- Affiliations: Boston Red Sox Radio Network

Ownership
- Owner: Vermont Broadcast Associates, Inc.
- Operator: Green Mountain Broadcasters LLC
- Sister stations: WKXH, WMTK, WGMT

History
- First air date: July 10, 1949; 76 years ago
- Former call signs: WTWN (1949–1979)
- Call sign meaning: St. Johnsbury

Technical information
- Licensing authority: FCC
- Facility ID: 49403
- Class: C
- Power: 1,000 watts unlimited
- Transmitter coordinates: 44°25′6.21″N 71°59′43.34″W
- Translator: (104.1 MHz) W281CC (St. Johnsbury)

Links
- Public license information: Public file; LMS
- Website: www.wstj1340.com

WSTJ (1340 AM, "The Trail 104.1") is a radio station broadcasting an adult album alternative format. Licensed to St. Johnsbury, Vermont, United States, the station is owned by Vermont Broadcast Associates, Inc. Under a local marketing agreement, Russ Ingalls' Green Mountain Broadcasters LLC operates WSTJ pending a full acquisition. WSTJ is an affiliate of the Boston Red Sox Radio Network. Its programming is also heard on FM translator W281CC (104.1).

The station went on the air in 1949 as WTWN. It was renamed WSTJ in 1979, after Twin State Broadcasters sold the station to Northeast Kingdom Broadcasting. Vermont Broadcast Associates purchased WSTJ in 1998; after launching its FM translator in 2020, it replaced oldies and adult standards with adult album alternative in 2021.

== History ==
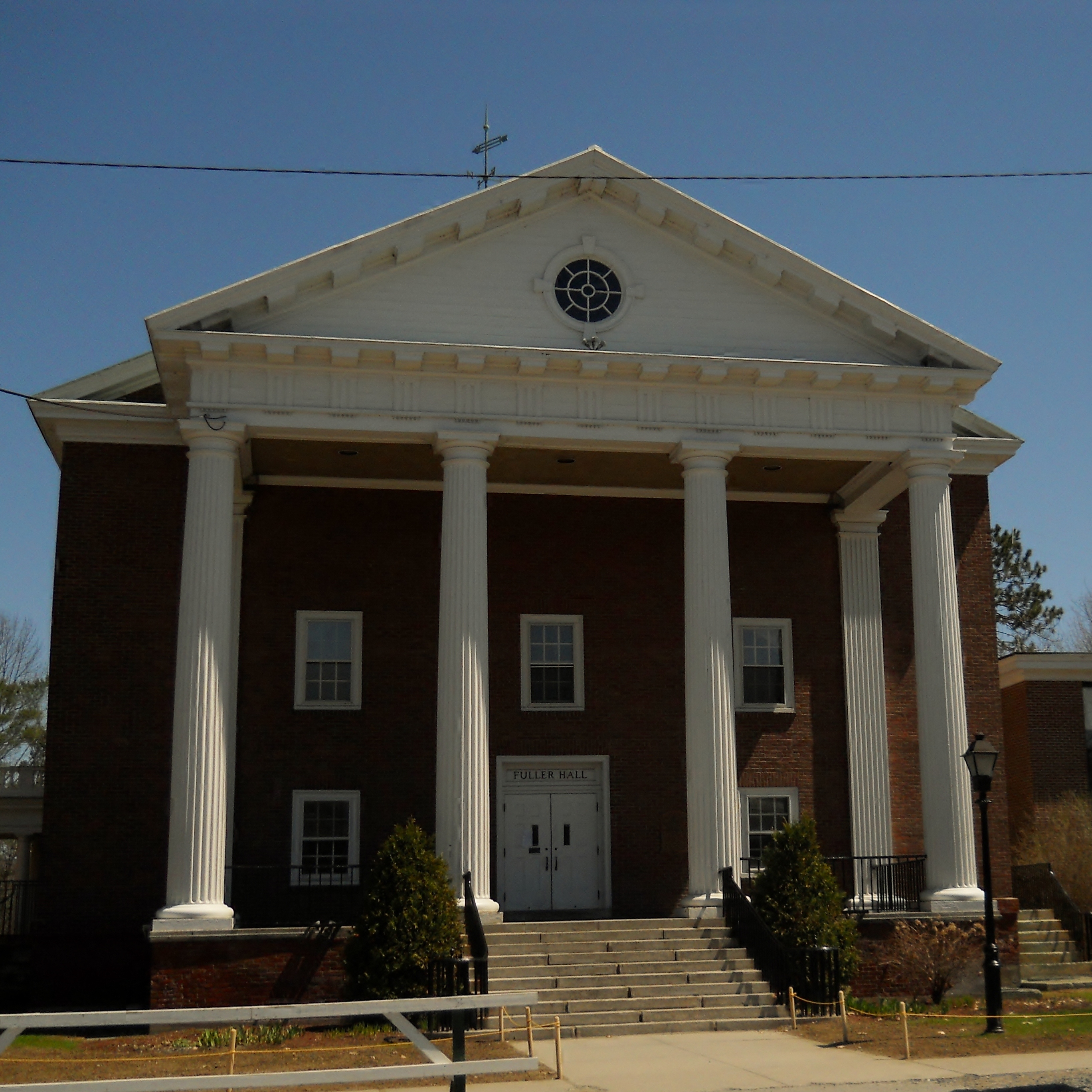
Fuller Hall at St. Johnsbury Academy was the location of WTWN's first broadcast

Twin State Broadcasters, Inc., obtained a construction permit for a new 250-watt radio station to serve St. Johnsbury on 1340 kHz on May 25, 1949. WTWN had its formal opening on July 10, 1949; the original studios were built atop what had been a manure pit on a farm. Two years later, it lived up to its Twin States moniker when it established a satellite studio in Littleton, New Hampshire. Three years after the station began broadcasting, Don Mullally joined and eventually took over the morning shift: he would remain at the station for most of the next 64 years (with the exception of a short stint in Glens Falls, New York, and a brief retirement to serve as the director of the Caledonia County fair), leaving the air for good only two weeks before his death in 2016; he was the last station employee still playing music off of vinyl records. In 1960, WTWN was approved to upgrade from 250 to 1,000 watts.

E. Dean Finney, who had been a manager and owner of the station since the outset, sold WTWN in 1979 to Northeast Kingdom Broadcasting, Inc.; the sale was part of a two-station transaction that also included Finney's only other broadcast holding, WIKE in Newport, as Finney said it was "time for a change" in his life. The new ownership was jointly held by Brent Lambert and Eric H. Johnson, two Boston optometrists who owned stations in California and Wyoming. The new owners changed the call letters to WSTJ on October 1. After Johnson bought out Lambert's stake in the company—which had been transferred to a bank—in 1993, Vermont Broadcast Associates bought WSTJ and the FM station it had started in 1985—WNKV (105.5 FM)—in 1998 for $630,000.

In December 2020, WSTJ launched an FM translator, W281CC (104.1 FM); while the station was still featuring an oldies/adult standards format at the time, it announced its intention to review the format after the Christmas holiday. The new format launched in February 2021 as adult album alternative "The Trail", so named for the region's ski and bike trails.

In February 2025, Bruce James agreed to sell the seven Vermont Broadcast Associates stations to Green Mountain Broadcasters, owned by Vermont state senator Russ Ingalls, for $996,000. Green Mountain then began managing the stations under a local marketing agreement.

== Translator ==
Call sign	Frequency	City of license	FID	ERP (W)	Class	Transmitter coordinates	FCC info
W281CC	104.1 FM	St. Johnsbury, Vermont	200719	250	D	44°24′38.2″N 71°58′11.3″W	LMS
