= Gore Mountain (Vermont) =

Mountain in Vermont, United States

- Location within Vermont

Highest point
- Elevation: 3,332 ft (1,016 m) NGVD 29
- Prominence: 1,982 ft (604 m)
- Listing: #45 New England Fifty Finest
- Coordinates: 44°55′11″N 71°47′38″W

Geography
- Location: Essex County, Vermont
- Topo map: USGS Norton Pond

Gore Mountain is a mountain located in the uninhabited Avery's Gore in Essex County, Vermont, about 6 miles (10 km) south of the Canada–US border with Quebec. In Vermont, gores and grants are unincorporated portions of a county which are not part of any town and have limited self-government (if any, as many are uninhabited). Gore Mtn. is flanked to the northeast by Black Mountain, and to the northwest by Middle Mountain.

The north and northwest sides of Gore Mountain drain via several short brooks into the Coaticook River, thence into the Massawippi River, Saint-François River, and Saint Lawrence River in Quebec, and thence into the Gulf of Saint Lawrence. The southwest side of Gore Mtn. drains into Jim Carroll Brook, thence into the North Branch of the Nulhegan River, the Connecticut River, and into Long Island Sound in Connecticut. The southeast side of Gore Mtn. drains into the Logger Branch, and the east side into the Black Branch, of the Nulhegan River.

== See also ==
- List of mountains in Vermont
- New England Fifty Finest
