= GHT =

GHT may refer to:

- Garden hose thread
- Generalised Hough transform
- Ghadames Air Transport, Libya, ICAO code
- Ghat Airport, Libya, IATA code
- Gilman Housing Trust
- Gloucester Harbour Trustees
- Gorlov helical turbine
- Göteborgs Handels- och Sjöfartstidning, a defunct Swedish newspaper
- Great Himalaya Trails
- Gresham Technologies plc, UK software company, LSE code
- Kutang language, ISO 639-3 code
- George H. Thomas, a noted American Civil War general
