= Canaan (CDP), Vermont =

Census-designated place in Vermont, United States

Canaan, Vermont
- Census-designated place
- Location in Essex County and the state of Vermont
- Coordinates: 44°59′58″N 71°32′12″W
- Country: United States
- State: Vermont
- County: Essex
- Town: Canaan

Area
  - Total: 1.63 sq mi (4.22 km^{2})
  - Land: 1.58 sq mi (4.10 km^{2})
  - Water: 0.046 sq mi (0.12 km^{2})
- Elevation: 1,224 ft (373 m)

Population (2010)
  - Total: 392
  - Density: 248/sq mi (95.6/km^{2})
- Time zone: UTC-5 (Eastern (EST))
  - Summer (DST): UTC-4 (EDT)
- ZIP code: 05901, 05903
- Area code: 802
- GNIS feature ID: 2586621
- FIPS code: 50-11725

Canaan is a census-designated place comprising the main settlement in the town of Canaan, Essex County, Vermont, United States. As of the 2010 census, it had a population of 392, out of a total town population of 972.

The Canaan CDP is in the northeast part of the town of Canaan and is bordered by Leach Creek to the west, the Connecticut River to the southeast, the community of Beecher Falls, Vermont, to the east, and the Canadian province of Quebec to the north. The community of West Stewartstown, New Hampshire, is to the southeast, across the Connecticut River. Beecher Falls to the east is the northeasternmost community in Vermont.

The Canaan CDP has a total area of 1.6 square miles (4.2 km^{2}), of which 1.6 square miles (4.1 km^{2}) is land and 0.046 square miles (0.12 km^{2}), or 2.87%, is water.
