= Island Pond Historic District =

Historic district in Vermont, United States

- U.S. National Register of Historic Places
- U.S. Historic district
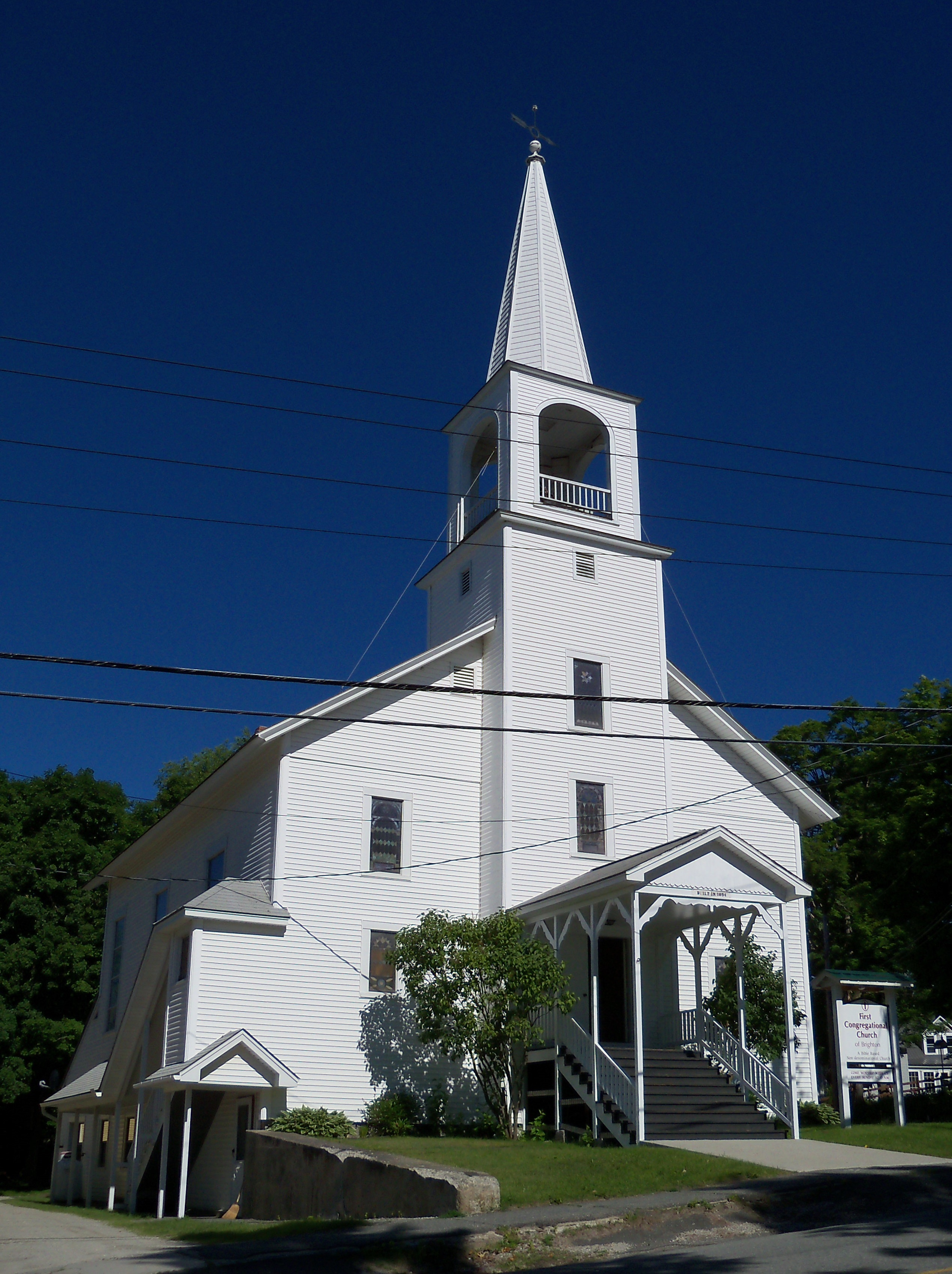
- First Congregational Church

- Location within Vermont Location within the United States
- Location: Jct. of VT 105 and VT 114, Island Pond, Vermont
- Coordinates: 44°48′54″N 71°52′52″W
- Area: 42 acres (17 ha)
- Built: 1853
- Architectural style: Second Empire, Italianate, Carpenter Gothic
- NRHP reference No.: 79000275
- Added to NRHP: January 31, 1979

The Island Pond Historic District encompasses a portion of the village of Island Pond in the town of Brighton, Vermont. The village was established in the 19th century as the halfway point in the Grand Trunk Railway, an international railroad connecting Portland, Maine and Montreal. Island Pond was a major service center for the railroad, and became a commercial hub of northeastern Vermont. The district was listed on the National Register of Historic Places in 1979.

== Description and history ==
The town of Brighton was an isolated farming community in northeastern Vermont prior to 1853, the year the two halves of the Grand Trunk Railway met at Island Pond (named for the nearby body of water, which has a small island in it). Over the next twenty years, the town's population rose from under 200 to more than 1,500, with many of the new residents somehow involved in the operations of the railroad. There was a large service yard in the area between Railroad and South Streets, where the former depot still stands, including service sheds and a turntable, and the station was a customs and immigration stop. The railroad was a driving economic force in the community, which suffered as the railroad declined in importance in the mid-20th century. Passenger service ended on the route in 1963, and much of the service infrastructure was demolished by the mid-1970s.

The historic district encompasses a large part of the northern section of the village of Island Pond. It is bounded on the south by Main Street and Railroad Street, which flank the railroad right-of-way to the north. It is bounded on the east by Elm and Mountain Streets, and the west by Maple Street, with its northern boundary at North Street. It covers 42 acres (17 ha), including the railroad-facing elements of the business district on the south side of Main and Railroad Streets, with the village's major residential area on the north side of the tracks. Most of the district's buildings were built in the half-century following the railroad's arrival in 1853, and are of vernacular wood-frame construction. There is only one brick buildings in the district (the railroad station), and three churches. Of the buildings in the district, only one, the Christ Church, is known to be architect-designed.

== See also ==
- National Register of Historic Places listings in Essex County, Vermont
