= Alice M. Ward Library =

- Jacobs Stand
- U.S. National Register of Historic Places
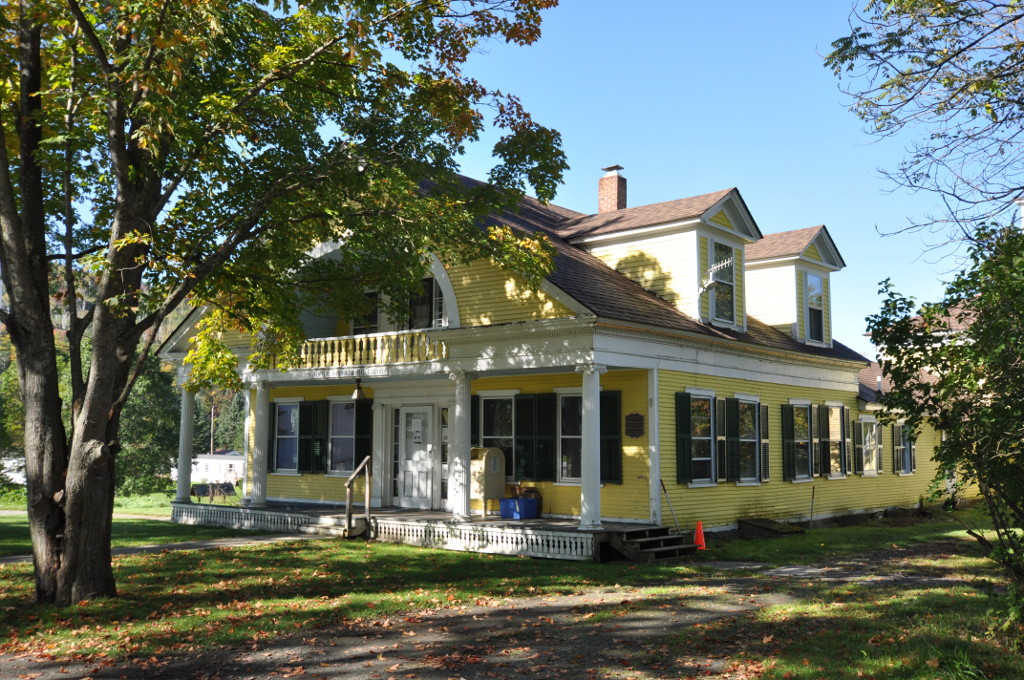
- The library in 2016

- Location within Vermont Location within the United States
- Location: 27 Park St., Canaan, Vermont
- Coordinates: 44°59′45″N 71°32′23″W
- Area: 0.5 acres (0.20 ha)
- Built: 1846
- Architectural style: Neo-Palladian Style
- NRHP reference No.: 80000332
- Added to NRHP: June 3, 1980

The Alice M. Ward Library is the public library serving Canaan, Essex County, Vermont. It is located at 27 Park St., in a former stagecoach inn, historically known as Jacobs Stand, built in 1846. The building was listed on the National Register of Historic Places in 1980.

== Building history and architecture ==
Built in 1846 by Fernando C. Jacobs as an inn or 'stand', the building was the northernmost stop on the stage route to Montreal, Quebec, Canada East. Due to Jacob's known stance against slavery, local folklore considers the building to be the former northernmost U.S. stop on the Connecticut River route of the 19th century Underground Railroad. However, there is no evidence supporting the theory. The building was sold in 1888 to physician Artemas Ward and later bequest to the town of Canaan as a public library in 1930 after the death of his wife Alice. The building is listed on the National Register of Historic Places for its distinctive Neo-Palladian temple-form design.

The library stands on the west side of the triangular town common in the center of Canaan village, near the southern end of Park Street where it meets Vermont Route 102. The building is a 1 1/2-story timber-framed structure, with a gabled roof and clapboarded exterior. The gable faces the street, and projects over a recessed porch, which has round Ionic columns for support. Recessed into the gable on the attic level is a rounded second-story porch area, giving the front its Palladian form. The main entrance is flanked by sidelight windows and pilasters, and is topped by a corniced entablature. The interior retains period Federal style woodwork, including a particularly fine central staircase.

== Services ==
According to 2000 Census figures as reported by the Vermont Department of Libraries, the Alice M. Ward Library serves a population of 1078, with a staff of two. While located in Canaan, it offers free library cards to all patrons, including seasonal visitors and those from neighboring towns. The Canaan Historical Society uses the top floor of the library for historical displays and public activities.

The library offers 24-hour wireless DSL Internet access and offers 4 computers for public use. It does not use content filtering. The library offers nontraditional items for public circulation, including snowshoes, a typewriter, cameras, craft items and Dremels. Other electronics, including a Sphero and Samsung Galaxy Tab 4s, are available for in-library use or used in library programming. Additionally, there is an Oculus Rift virtual reality headset available for use of the public. The library was reported in 2016 as meeting all state standards. In 2018 the library began an oral history project with a particular focus on the Ethan Allen factory in Beecher Falls.

== Educational programs ==
The Alice Ward Library offers several educational programs for a variety of ages year-round. The library has a multitude of STEM-focused opportunities, such as a regularly meeting technology club. The library also runs a FIRST Lego League Challenge team as well as a FIRST Tech Challenge team.

== See also ==
- List of libraries
- National Register of Historic Places listings in Essex County, Vermont
