= Averys Gore, Vermont =

Unincorporated parcel of land in Essex County, Vermont, United States

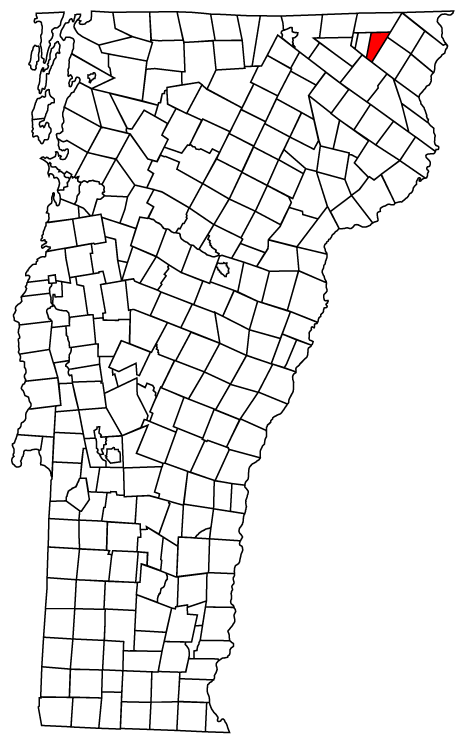
Averys Gore, Vermont

Averys Gore (or Avery's Gore) is a gore located in Essex County, Vermont, United States. The gore is at an elevation of 2382 feet with coordinates of 44°53′20″N 71°49′42″W.

In Vermont, gores and grants are unincorporated portions of a county which are not part of any town and have limited self-government (if any, as some are uninhabited). The population was 0 at the 2020 census. However, the gore does have a few hundred feet of dirt road and one building or structure, on the North Branch of the Nulhegan River by the Lewis town line. More prominently, Gore Mountain, one of the 50 highest in the state, is in the eastern portion of Averys Gore.

It is one of a number of locations in Vermont that were known as Averys Gore (or Avery's Gore), the others having been incorporated over the years into other towns in Addison County, Chittenden County, Franklin County, and Windham County.

== History and name ==
Averys Gore is named for Samuel Avery, a Westminster deputy sheriff and jailkeeper. Avery received roughly 52,000 acres (21,000 ha) in eight separate gores and grants in the 1790s as compensation for land he had owned in a part of the state previously claimed by New York.

The original charter (as reproduced in State Papers of Vermont, Volume Two: Charters Granted by the State of Vermont, VT Secretary of State, 1922, pp 9–11) merely mentions the boundaries of the tract of land, along with two others included in the same charter, granting them to Samuel Avery, but not mentioning any names for the tracts of land. State Papers of Vermont, Volume One: Index to the Papers of the Surveyors-General (VT Secretary of State, 1918) lists all the gores granted to Samuel Avery collectively as "Avery's Gores (Alias Vermont Grants to Samuel Avery)" (p. 31).

While State of Vermont records seem to have consistently used the apostrophe, including state statutes (Title 17, Chapter 34, Section 1893, T. 24, Ch. 1, Sec. 6, and T. 24, Ch. 117, Sec. 4341(e)), the U.S. Board on Geographic Names eschews the use of apostrophes in geographic names, which may improperly imply personal possession. This has led to the use of both spellings. The apostrophe is omitted in Vermont Place-Names: Footprints of History by Esther M. Swift (The Stephen Greene Press, 1977, pp 198–9) and in the Vermont Atlas and Gazetteer (Delorme, 9th ed., 1996, p. 55).

== Geography ==
According to the United States Census Bureau, the gore has a total area of 17.6 square miles (45.5 km^{2}), of which 0.035 square miles (0.09 km^{2}), or 0.19%, is water. The north side of the gore drains via several brooks into the Coaticook River, part of the St. Lawrence River basin, while the rest of the gore drains south via the North Branch of the Nulhegan River or the Black Branch of the Nulhegan and is part of the Connecticut River basin.

== Demographics ==
As of the 2020 census, there are no people living in the gore. The most recent census year for which the gore was populated was 1950.
