= WKXH =

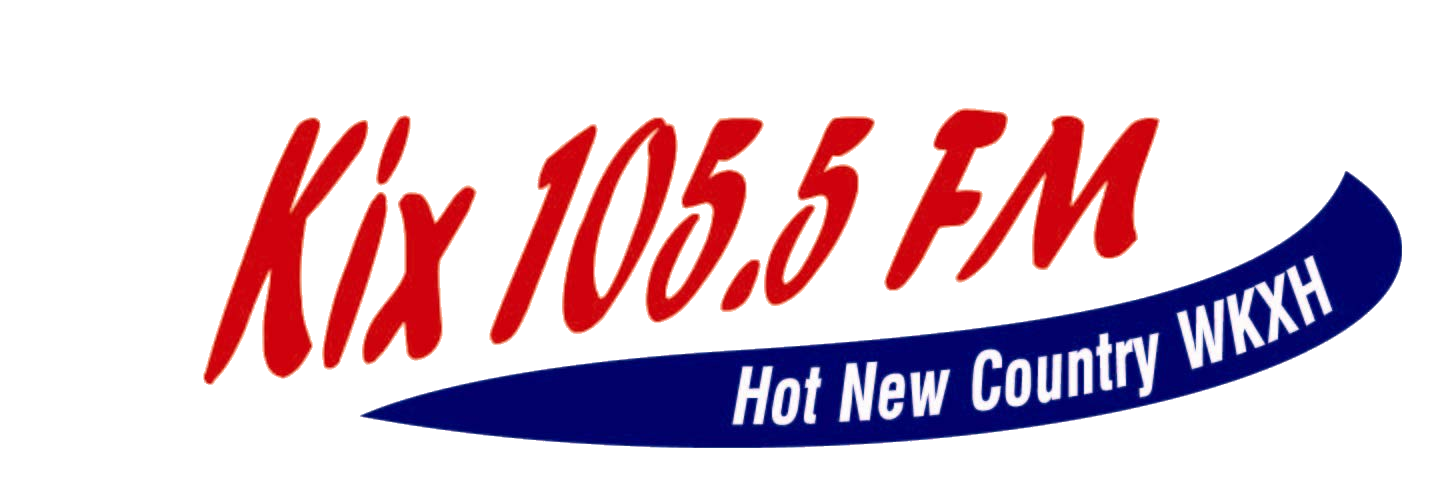
- St. Johnsbury, Vermont; United States
- Broadcast area: Caledonia and Southern Essex County, Vermont
- Frequency: 105.5 MHz
- Branding: Kix 105.5 WKXH

Programming
- Format: Country
- Affiliations: Westwood One

Ownership
- Owner: Vermont Broadcast Associates, Inc.
- Operator: Green Mountain Broadcasters LLC
- Sister stations: WMTK, WSTJ, WGMT

History
- First air date: August 1, 1985 (as WNKV)
- Former call signs: WNKV (1985–1998)

Technical information
- Licensing authority: FCC
- Facility ID: 49401
- Class: A
- ERP: 1,250 watts
- HAAT: 217 meters (712 ft)
- Transmitter coordinates: 44°24′38.2″N 71°58′11.3″W

Links
- Public license information: Public file; LMS
- Webcast: Listen live
- Website: www.kix1055.com

WKXH (105.5 FM) is a radio station broadcasting a new country format. Licensed to St. Johnsbury, Vermont, United States, the station is owned by Vermont Broadcast Associates, Inc. Under a local marketing agreement, Russ Ingalls' Green Mountain Broadcasters LLC operates WKXH pending a full acquisition.

== History ==
The station was assigned the call letters WNKV on April 10, 1985; it signed on August 1. On June 6, 1998, the station changed its call sign to the current WKXH.

In February 2025, Bruce James agreed to sell the seven Vermont Broadcast Associates stations to Green Mountain Broadcasters, owned by Vermont state senator Russ Ingalls, for $996,000. Green Mountain then began managing the stations under a local marketing agreement.
