= Vermont Department for Children and Families =

American state government agency

Agency overview
- Jurisdiction: Vermont
- Headquarters: Waterbury, Vermont
- Agency executive: Sean Brown, DCF Commissioner
- Parent agency: Vermont Agency of Human Services
- Website: DCF website

The Vermont Department for Children and Families (DCF) is a government agency of the U.S. state of Vermont, headquartered in the Waterbury Office Complex in Waterbury.

The department was formed on July 1, 2004.

== Divisions ==
The divisions of DCF are as follows:

- Child Development Division
- Disability Determination Services
- Economic Services Division
- Family Services Division
- Office of Child Support
- Office of Economic Opportunity

DCF operates the Woodside Juvenile Rehabilitation Center, used for short-term placement and long-term treatment of juvenile delinquents. It is Vermont's sole locked juvenile facility. The detention program can serve up to 16 boys and girls, and the treatment program can serve up to 12 boys. Woodside is located in Colchester.

== Investigation ==
In 2010, the IRS began investigating a former DCF employee from Newport who was accused of embezzling $490,000 using 250 checks, from August 2004 until October 2009. The technical charge was failure to report income and pay income tax. She was found guilty in 2011, imprisoned and ordered to make restitution.
