= Canaan, Vermont =

- Town
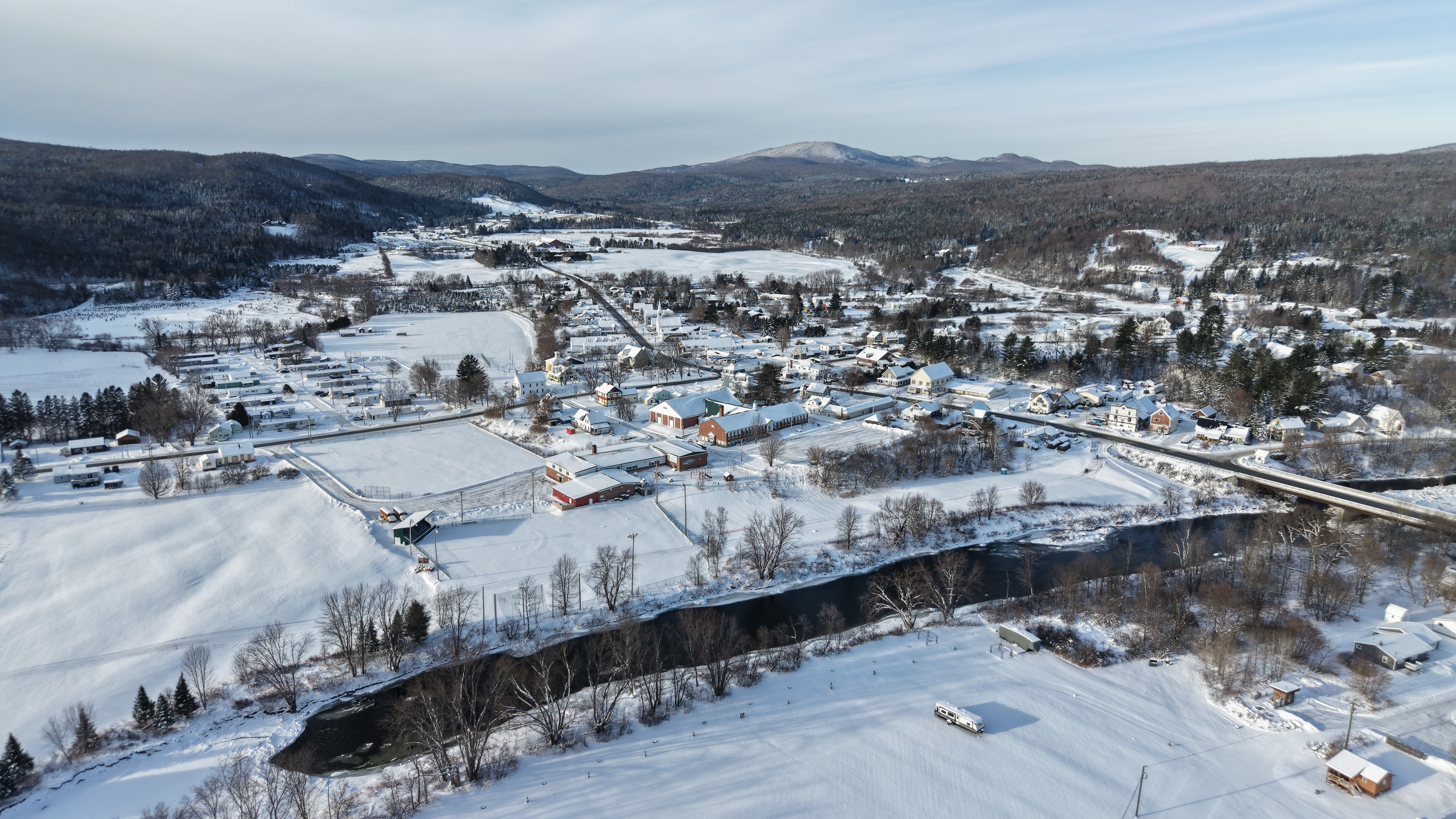
- Canaan, VT, from the southeast

- Location in Essex County and the state of Vermont.
- Coordinates: 44°58′40″N 71°34′42″W
- Country: United States
- State: Vermont
- County: Essex
- Communities: Canaan; Beecher Falls; Wallace Pond

Area
  - Total: 33.4 sq mi (86.6 km^{2})
  - Land: 33.0 sq mi (85.5 km^{2})
  - Water: 0.42 sq mi (1.1 km^{2})
- Elevation: 1,283 ft (391 m)

Population (2020)
  - Total: 896
  - Density: 27/sq mi (10.5/km^{2})
- Time zone: UTC-5 (EST)
  - Summer (DST): UTC-4 (EDT)
- ZIP codes: 05903 (Canaan); 05902 (Beecher Falls)
- Area code: 802
- FIPS code: 50-11800
- GNIS feature ID: 1462064
- Website: www.canaan-vt.org

Canaan is a town in Essex County, Vermont, United States. The population was 896 at the 2020 census. Canaan contains the village of Beecher Falls, located at the confluence of the Connecticut River and Halls Stream. It is part of the Berlin, NH-VT Micropolitan Statistical Area.

Due to Québécois ancestry, 26% of Canaan residents speak French as their primary language, making the town one of New England's "Little Canadas." This is a decrease from 1982, when nearly 44% spoke French as their native language.

== Geography ==
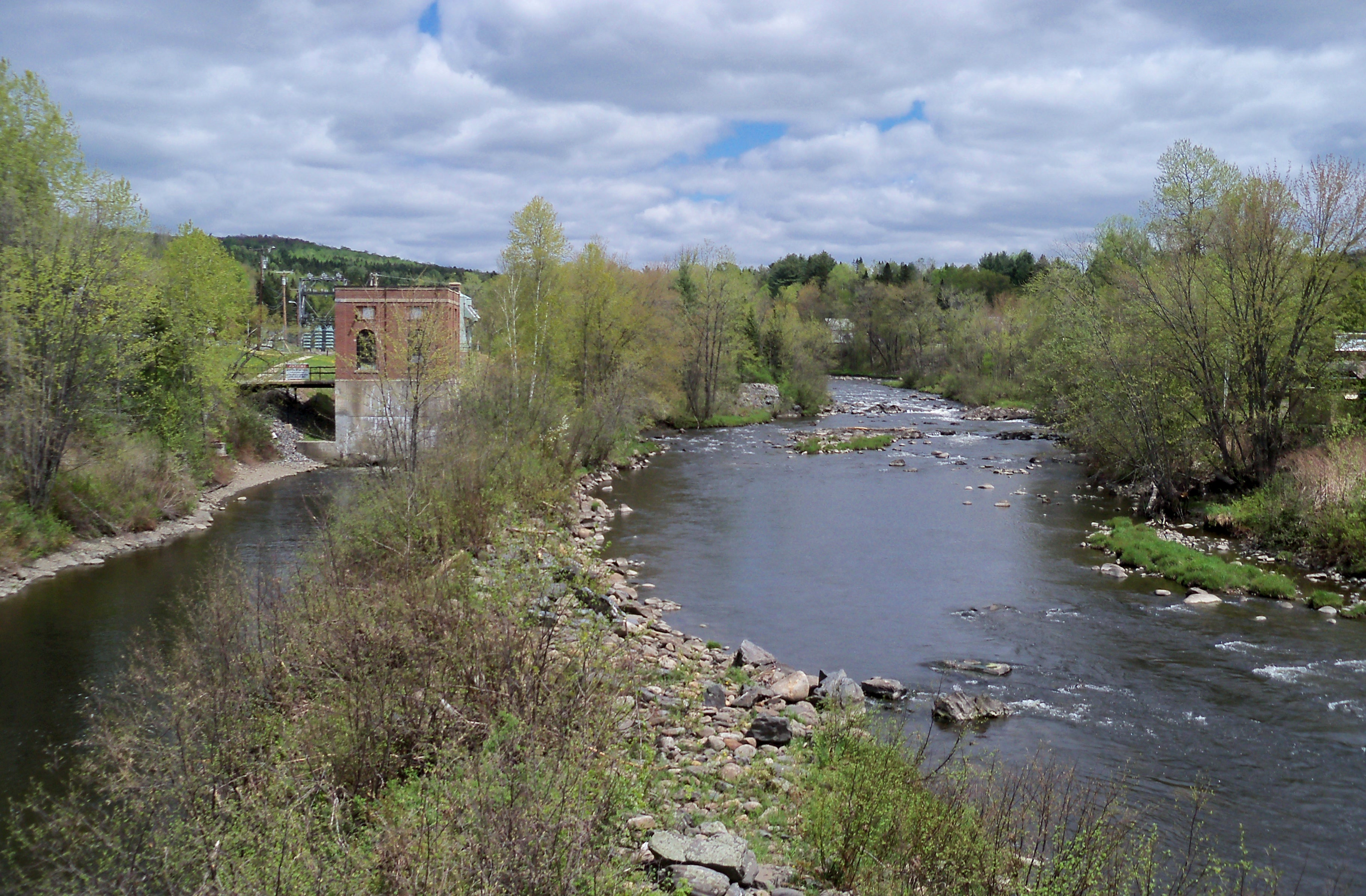
The Connecticut River between Canaan and Stewartstown, New Hampshire

Canaan is the northeasternmost town in Vermont, bordered by the Canadian province of Quebec to the north and the U.S. state of New Hampshire to the east. It is one of two towns in Vermont to share a border with both another state and Canada, the other such town being Alburgh in the northwestern corner. Canaan has two border crossings with Quebec, each approximately 3 miles (4.8 km) apart. The border crossings are, from west to east, Canaan–Hereford Road Border Crossing, accessed by Vermont Route 141 and Quebec Route 141, and Beecher Falls–East Hereford Border Crossing, accessed by Vermont Route 253 and Quebec Route 253.

According to the United States Census Bureau, the town has a total area of 33.4 square miles (86.6 km^{2}), of which 33.0 square miles (85.5 km^{2}) is land and 0.42 square miles (1.1 km^{2}), or 1.24%, is water.

== Demographics ==
Historical population
Census	Pop.	Note	%±
1790	19		—
1800	45		136.8%
1810	332		637.8%
1820	227		−31.6%
1830	373		64.3%
1840	378		1.3%
1850	471		24.6%
1860	408		−13.4%
1870	419		2.7%
1880	637		52.0%
1890	829		30.1%
1900	934		12.7%
1910	869		−7.0%
1920	982		13.0%
1930	906		−7.7%
1940	872		−3.8%
1950	969		11.1%
1960	1,094		12.9%
1970	949		−13.3%
1980	1,196		26.0%
1990	1,121		−6.3%
2000	1,078		−3.8%
2010	972		−9.8%
2020	896		−7.8%
U.S. Decennial Census

As of the census of 2000, there were 1,078 people, 441 households, and 306 families living in the town. The population density was 32.5 inhabitants per square mile (12.5/km^{2}). There were 650 housing units at an average density of 19.6 per square mile (7.6/km^{2}). The racial makeup of the town was 95.83% White, 0.19% African American, 0.83% Native American, 0.09% Asian, and 3.06% from two or more races. Hispanic or Latino of any race were 0.28% of the population.

There were 441 households, out of which 33.6% had children under the age of 18 living with them, 55.1% were married couples living together, 8.6% had a female householder with no husband present, and 30.4% were non-families. 26.8% of all households were made up of individuals, and 11.1% had someone living alone who was 65 years of age or older. The average household size was 2.44 and the average family size was 2.94.

In the town, the population was spread out, with 26.9% under the age of 18, 6.2% from 18 to 24, 27.6% from 25 to 44, 25.4% from 45 to 64, and 13.8% who were 65 years of age or older. The median age was 39 years. For every 100 females, there were 100.0 males. For every 100 females age 18 and over, there were 97.5 males.

The median income for a household in the town was $32,574, and the median income for a family was $36,705. Males had a median income of $28,913 versus $21,544 for females. The per capita income for the town was $14,131. About 10.2% of families and 14.3% of the population were below the poverty line, including 16.7% of those under age 18 and 18.7% of those age 65 or over.

== Government ==
=== Social services ===
Social services are provided in part by the Northeast Kingdom Community Action, located in Canaan, as well as in other Northeast Kingdom sites.

Northeast Kingdom Learning Services provides Adult Education and Literacy and High School Completion services to Canaan at no charge.

=== Town Meeting ===
Canaan, Vermont holds a town meeting on town meeting day, held in the school's gymnasium.

== Economy ==
Since the start of the 20th century, Canaan has lost many logging jobs and most family farms. Tourism is now an important part of the local economy.

The Beecher Falls furniture factory, a division of Ethan Allen, closed its manufacturing unit in August 2009, laying off 238 workers and leaving only the rough mill open. The plant opened in 1895 and was once the largest furniture factory east of Michigan.

== Notable people ==
- Samuel Ingham, attorney and politician, practiced law in Canaan
- Norris Garshom Starkweather, architect, resided in Canaan
- Neil Tillotson, inventor, born in Canaan

== See also ==
- Alice M. Ward Library
