= Rural Edge =

RuralEdge, formerly known as Gilman Housing Trust, is a non-profit housing and community-development corporation that focuses on affordability. The corporation has served the Northeast Kingdom for over 30 years with their main focus being to strengthen homes and communities in and around the Northeast Kingdom, in the northeast corner of the U.S. state of Vermont.

== History ==
RuralEdge began in 1986 with a focus on providing housing for families, seniors, and those with disabilities.

In 1998, RuralEdge became a Chartered Member of the NeighborWorks America Network.

== Leadership ==
Patrick Shattuck has been the Executive Director of RuralEdge since 2019.

== Departments ==
=== Real Estate Development ===
This team is responsible for the redevelopment and rehabilitation of the existing portfolio, as well as creating additional units to serve the needs of the Northeast Kingdom. Of their many projects, the largest is the redevelopment of New Avenue, formerly the Depot Square Apartments, in St. Johnsbury, which will create 40 units of affordable housing for families, seniors, those with disabilities, as well as units designated for those exiting homelessness.

=== Community Development ===
This team is responsible for the administration of the Support and Services at Home (SASH) Program, as well as the Neighborworks Community Building & Engagement (CB&E) Program, communications, and outreach. The goal of this department is to support our residents in their housing choice, keeping them safely in their homes as long as possible, developing the communities at our developments, as well as advocating for the Northeast Kingdom at the state level in the housing needs of our three counties.

=== Homeownership Center ===
As a Neighborworks Organization (NWO), RuralEdge operates a Homeownership Center (HOC) aimed at supporting individuals and families attain homeownership, as well as helping low to moderate income homeowners make necessary repairs to their homes. This is accomplished through a monthly Homebuyer Education Workshop, which walks prospective homebuyers through the process of purchasing a home and looking at their current financial readiness for a mortgage, and through the Revolving Loan Fund Home Repair Program, which offers grant and low-interest loans to low to moderate income homeowners make necessary health and safety repairs to their homes, mostly in the form of roof repair, well repair and septic repair. The HOC is vital to the housing market, as it prepares people for homeownership which, in turn, takes a burden off of the rental market.

=== Property Management ===
RuralEdge currently owns and operates a portfolio of over 600 affordable rental units, as well as some commercial units. These units are spread across the three counties that make up the Northeast Kingdom. They employ five property managers, four compliance personnel, and nearly a dozen maintenance technicians to keep the 33 properties in the portfolio running efficiently and sustainably. For most of 2021, the residential vacancy rate has been at about three percent, with most of those units processing prospective tenants at any given time.

=== Finance ===
RuralEdge rebranded in 2013 from Gilman Housing Trust, and is now RuralEdge dba Gilman Housing Trust. As such, the finance department handles the internal operations of Gilman Housing Trust, Inc (dba RuralEdge), as well as the financial operations of each property, most of which are single asset LLCs (i.e. Scenic View in Westfield, Vermont is legally known as RuralEdge Scenic View LLC).

== List of Properties ==
- Crystal Lake Housing, Barton
- Coventry Senior Housing, Coventry
- Johns River Apartments, Derby & Derby Line
- Derby Line Gardens, Derby Line
- Gilman Senior Housing, Gilman
- Glover Housing, Glover
- Clarks Landing, Groton
- Groton Community Housing, Groton
- The Meadows, Irasburg
- Olivia Place, Lyndonville
- Mathewson Block Housing, Lyndonville
- Marigold Apartments, Lyndonville
- Maple Ridge Mobile Home Park, Lyndonville
- The Darling Inn, Lyndonville
- 599 Main Street, Lyndonville
- Parkview Apartments, Newport
- Newport Senior Housing, Newport
- Lakeview Housing, Newport
- Lakebridge Housing, Newport
- Governor Prouty Apartments, Newport
- Governors Mansion Apartments, Newport
- Shattuck Hill Mobile Home Park, Newport
- Rainbow Apartments, Orleans
- Lind Homes, South Ryegate
- 1867 Building, St. Johnsbury
- Caledonia Housing, St. Johnsbury
- Hilltop Family Housing, St. Johnsbury
- Moose River Housing, St. Johnsbury
- Mountain View Housing, St. Johnsbury
- Passumpsic View Apartments, St. Johnsbury
