= Joe Gunther =

Joe Gunther is the hero of Archer Mayor's long-running mystery novel series largely set in Vermont and particularly in the city of Brattleboro.

Gunther was born around 1933 on a farm near Thetford, Vermont. He fought in the Korean War, then went to college in Berkeley and eventually joined the Brattleboro Police Department as a street patrolman. At the time of the events depicted in the first book in the series (1988), Gunther is the second most senior detective in Brattleboro PD, with nearly 30 years of experience. He subsequently becomes the head of detectives and then moves to the (fictitious) "Vermont Bureau of Investigations", which allows him to investigate serious crimes anywhere within the state.

It is revealed in later books that he made the transition from patrolman to detective some time around 1970. He was briefly married, but he lost his wife to cancer less than two years after becoming a detective, and he never remarried. He had a long-lasting relationship with Gail Zigman, a Brattleboro realtor turned politician, followed by a relationship with state Medical Examiner, Beverly Hillstrom. He has a younger brother Leo, who still lives in Thetford with their elderly mother as of the events of The Surrogate Thief (2004).

== Books ==
The Joe Gunther mystery series includes 33 books.

1. Open Season (1988)
2. Borderlines (1990)
3. Scent Of Evil (1991)
4. The Skeleton's Knee (1992)
5. Fruits Of the Poisonous Tree (1993)
6. The Dark Root (1994)
7. The Ragman's Memory (1995)
8. Bellows Falls (1996)
9. The Disposable Man (1997)
10. Occam's Razor (1999)
11. The Marble Mask (2000)
12. Tucker Peak (2001)
13. The Sniper's Wife (2002)
14. Gatekeeper (2003)
15. The Surrogate Thief (2004)
16. St. Albans Fire (2005)
17. The Second Mouse (2006)
18. Chat (2007)
19. The Catch (2008)
20. The Price of Malice (2009)
21. Red Herring (2010)
22. Tag Man (2011)
23. Paradise City (2012)
24. Three Can Keep a Secret (2013)
25. Proof Positive (2014)
26. The Company She Kept (2015)*
27. Presumption of Guilt (2016)
28. Trace (2017)
29. Bury the Lead (2018)
30. Bomber's Moon (2019)
31. The Orphan's Guilt (2020)
32. Marked Man (2021)
33. Fall Guy (2022)
34. "Crosscut" (2024)

== See also ==
- Fruit of the poisonous tree
