= Archer Mayor =

American writer

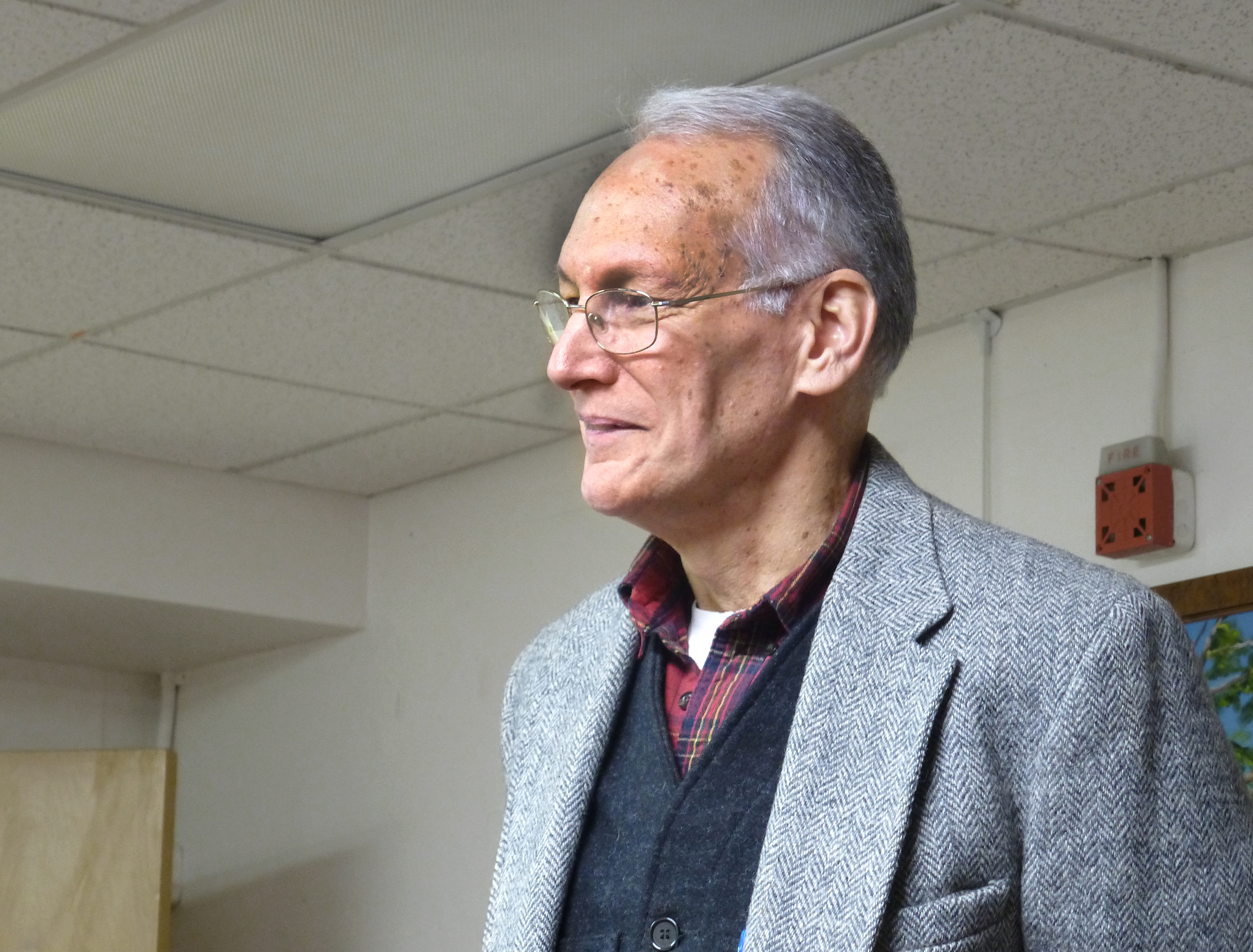
- Mayor in 2014
- Occupation: Author
- Writing career
- Genre: Detective fiction
- Website: archermayor.com

Archer Mayor is an American mystery author of the Joe Gunther detective series.

== Early life and education ==
Mayor was born on July 30, 1950 in Mt. Kisco, New York, and moved with his family to Canada at the age of one. From there, they moved to South America, and then to Europe, living in 30 different places before he was 30 years old.

Mayor graduated from Yale and studied U.S. History. After he graduated, he traveled throughout the U.S. before joining Time Inc., where he worked for their book division as a researcher. From there, he moved to Vermont and has worked in politics, as a theater photographer, a newspaper writer and editor, a lab technician for Paris-Match Magazine, and as a medical illustrator. While working as a special projects editor for the University of Texas Press in 1975, Mayor discovered the then-unpublished manuscript of T.H. White's The Book of Merlyn, the final part of his Once and Future King series, which was eventually published in 1977.

He currently lives in Newfane, Vermont with his wife Margot Zalkind Mayor, where he has worked as a detective for the Windham County sheriff's department, a death investigator for Vermont Department of Health's Office of the Chief Medical Examiner, and as an EMT and firefighter.

== Career ==
In 1988, Mayor published the first installment of his Joe Gunther mystery series, Open Season, which he explained was "written as three completely separate books," which he ended up throwing out each time to start over. "When I wrote the third and final version of Open Season, it damn near wrote itself. I'd found my musical voice. I found the place: Brattleboro. I found the greater context: Vermont.

Mayor followed up Open Season with Borderlines in 1990, and continued annually through 2022 with Fall Guy, the 33d installment of the series. He has used his experience in law enforcement to inform his novels and has noted that he doesn't plot out his books, preferring to let the story play out as he writes.

In 2004, he was awarded the New England Independent Booksellers Association Award for Best Fiction and in 2012, he received the Governor's Award for Excellence in the Arts.

In July 2022, Mayor announced that he was pausing his Joe Gunther series, saying in an interview that while writing mysteries has been useful to process his work as a death investigator, "if you do anything for 40-plus years, as I have been, a writer of both history and fiction, I think you do need a break every once in a while. Need to recharge your batteries, and maybe you just take the batteries out."

== Bibliography ==
- Southern Timberman: The Legacy of William Buchanan (1988)
- Huron Mountain Club: The First Hundred Years (1989)
- Joe Gunther series (1988–2022)
