= WIKE =

Simulcasting WMTK Littleton, New Hampshire
- Newport, Vermont; United States
- Broadcast area: Orleans County; Memphrémagog RCM
- Frequency: 1490 kHz C-QUAM AM stereo
- Branding: The Notch

Programming
- Format: Classic rock
- Affiliations: Boston Red Sox Radio Network

Ownership
- Owner: Vermont Broadcast Associates, Inc.
- Operator: Green Mountain Broadcasters LLC
- Sister stations: WJJZ, WMOO, WMTK

History
- First air date: October 12, 1952

Technical information
- Licensing authority: FCC
- Facility ID: 49400
- Class: C
- Power: 1,000 watts unlimited
- Transmitter coordinates: 44°56′28.00″N 72°13′35.00″W
- Translator: 103.1 W276DK (Derby Center)

Links
- Public license information: Public file; LMS
- Webcast: Listen live
- Website: notchfm.com

WIKE (1490 AM) is a commercial radio station located in Newport, Vermont. It is owned by Vermont Broadcast Associates, Inc. and it broadcasts a classic rock format, simulcast from 106.3 WMTK in Littleton, New Hampshire. Both stations call themselves "The Notch". WIKE's programming is also heard on translator station W276DK (103.1 FM) in Derby Center. Under a local marketing agreement, Russ Ingalls' Green Mountain Broadcasters LLC operates the stations pending a full acquisition.

WIKE went on the air in 1952. The station was a country music station in the 2000s, before switching to classic rock in the 2010s.

== History ==
On October 12, 1952, WIKE first signed on. It was owned by Memphremagog Broadcasting and was powered at 250 watts. In the 1960s, the daytime power was boosted to 1,000 watts and in the 1980s, it also increased its nighttime power to 1,000 watts.

In 1991, an FM station was added, 92.1 WMOO, which is licensed to nearby Derby Center. WMOO is programmed with a hot adult contemporary format. In 2001, both stations were acquired by Northstar Media, Inc for just over $1 million.

During most of the early 2000s, WIKE was a country music station, switching to classic rock in the mid-2010s.

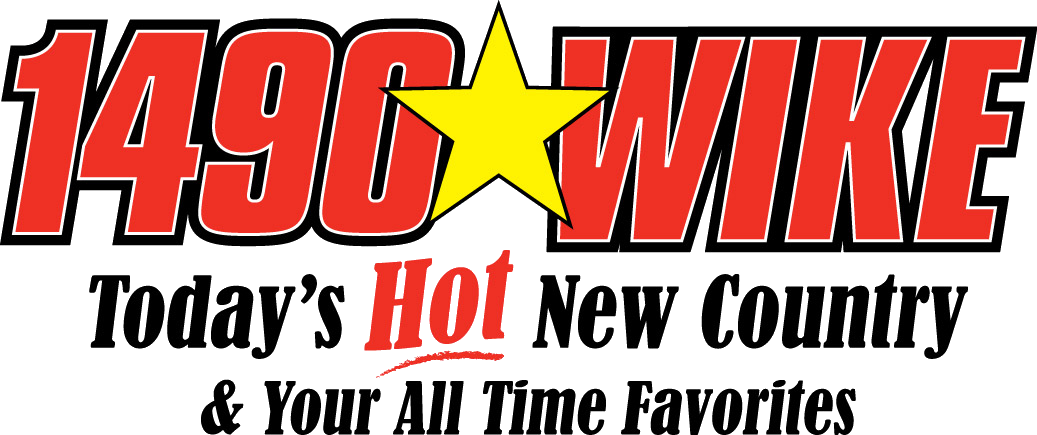
The WIKE logo from the early 2000s

On May 22, 2012, WIKE, along with 29 other Nassau Broadcasting Partners stations in Northern New England, was purchased at a bankruptcy auction by Carlisle Capital Corporation, a company controlled by Bill Binnie (owner of WBIN-TV in Derry). WIKE, and 12 of the other stations, were then acquired by Vertical Capital Partners, controlled by Jeff Shapiro.

Soon after taking over, Vertical resold WIKE and sister station 92.1 WMOO to Vermont Broadcast Associates.

The sale of WIKE and the other 12 stations was consummated on November 30, 2012, at a purchase price of $4.4 million. The resale of WIKE and WMOO was consummated on January 1, 2013, at a purchase price of $760,000.

In February 2025, Bruce James agreed to sell the seven Vermont Broadcast Associates stations to Green Mountain Broadcasters, owned by Vermont state senator Russ Ingalls, for $996,000. Green Mountain then began managing the stations under a local marketing agreement.

== Translator ==
Call sign	Frequency	City of license	FID	ERP (W)	Class	Transmitter coordinates	FCC info
W276DK	103.1 FM	Derby Center, Vermont	200721	250	D	44°57′12.8″N 72°8′13.6″W	LMS
