= Derby Center, Vermont =

- Village
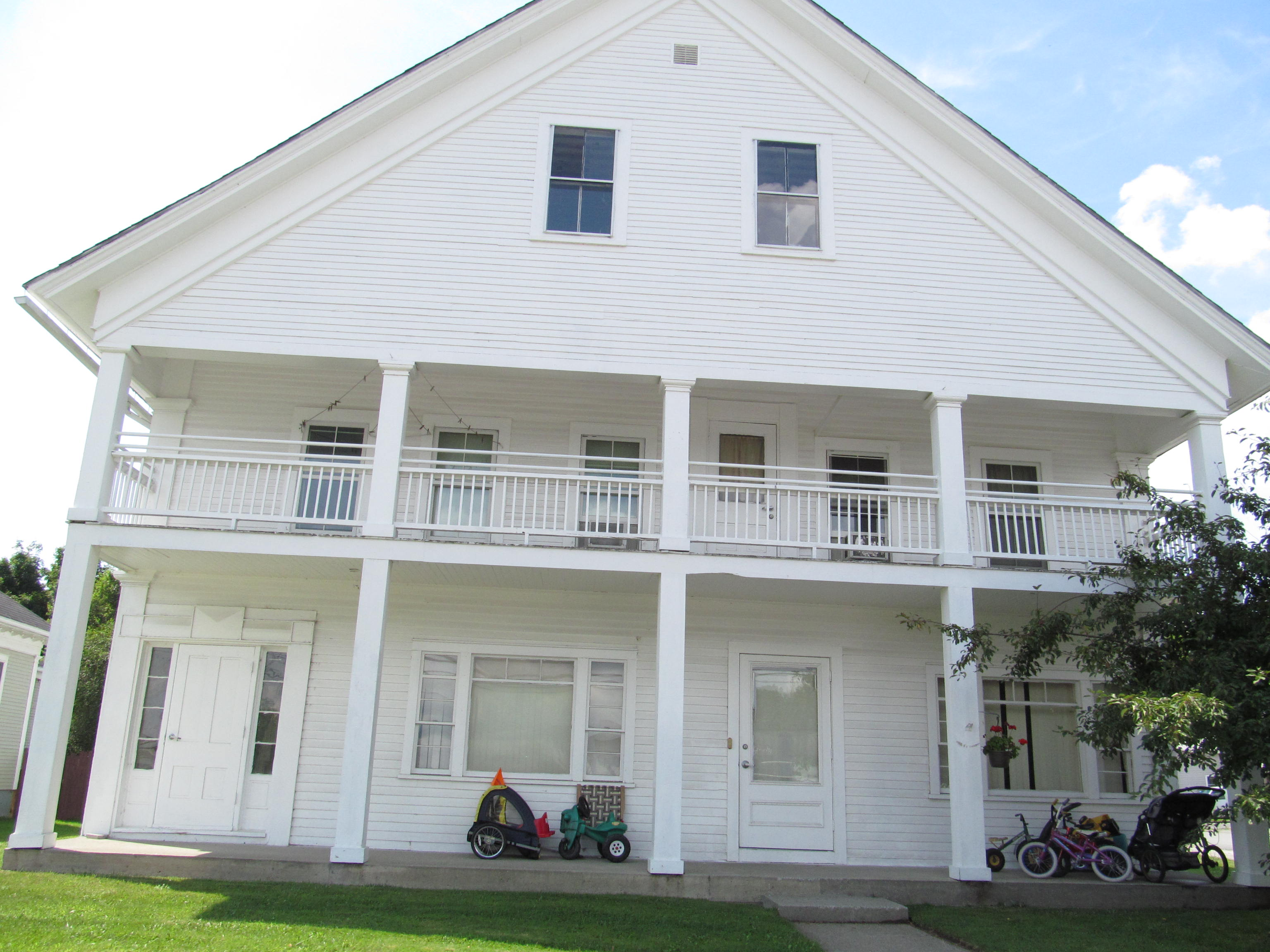

- Location within the state of Vermont Derby Center (the United States)
- Coordinates: 44°57′16″N 72°07′48″W
- Country: United States
- State: Vermont
- County: Orleans
- Town: Derby

Area
  - Total: 1.40 sq mi (3.63 km^{2})
  - Land: 1.39 sq mi (3.61 km^{2})
  - Water: 0.0077 sq mi (0.02 km^{2})
- Elevation: 1,007 ft (307 m)

Population (2020)
  - Total: 635
  - Density: 456/sq mi (176/km^{2})
- Time zone: UTC-5 (Eastern (EST))
  - Summer (DST): UTC-4 (EDT)
- ZIP Code: 05829 (Derby)
- Area code: 802
- FIPS code: 50-17425
- GNIS feature ID: 2378303

Derby Center is a village in the town of Derby, Orleans County, Vermont, United States. The population was 635 at the 2020 census.

== Geography ==
According to the United States Census Bureau, the village has a total area of 1.5 square miles (3.8 km^{2}), all land.

== Demographics ==
Historical population
Census	Pop.	Note	%±
1900	297		—
1910	316		6.4%
1920	292		−7.6%
1930	300		2.7%
1940	346		15.3%
1950	383		10.7%
1960	433		13.1%
1970	547		26.3%
1980	598		9.3%
1990	684		14.4%
2000	670		−2.0%
2010	597		−10.9%
2020	635		6.4%
U.S. Decennial Census

As of the census of 2000, there were 670 people, 283 households, and 187 families residing in the village. The population density was 454.9 people per square mile (176.0/km^{2}). There were 295 housing units at an average density of 200.3/sq mi (77.5/km^{2}). The racial makeup of the village was 97.46% White, 0.15% African American, 0.45% Native American, 0.30% Asian, and 1.64% from two or more races. Hispanic or Latino of any race were 0.60% of the population.

There were 283 households, out of which 34.6% had children under the age of 18 living with them, 44.9% were married couples living together, 15.5% had a female householder with no husband present, and 33.6% were non-families. 28.3% of all households were made up of individuals, and 13.1% had someone living alone who was 65 years of age or older. The average household size was 2.29 and the average family size was 2.72.

In the village, the population was spread out, with 25.4% under the age of 18, 9.7% from 18 to 24, 26.4% from 25 to 44, 19.6% from 45 to 64, and 19.0% who were 65 years of age or older. The median age was 37 years. For every 100 females, there were 95.3 males. For every 100 females age 18 and over, there were 83.2 males.

The median income for a household in the village was $27,865, and the median income for a family was $30,417. Males had a median income of $30,192 versus $16,375 for females. The per capita income for the village was $15,435. About 5.2% of families and 9.0% of the population were below the poverty line, including 7.1% of those under age 18 and 8.7% of those age 65 or over.

== Education ==
The North Country Union Junior High School (7-8) is here.

== Media ==
=== Radio ===
- WMOO - 92.1 FM
