= WMOO =

- Derby Center, Vermont; United States
- Broadcast area: Northeast Kingdom; Southern Estrie
- Frequency: 92.1 MHz
- Branding: Moo 92

Programming
- Format: Contemporary hit radio
- Network: Compass Media Networks; Premiere Networks

Ownership
- Owner: Vermont Broadcast Associates, Inc.
- Operator: Green Mountain Broadcasters LLC

History
- First air date: April 1, 1991
- Call sign meaning: referring to a cow's sound effect

Technical information
- Licensing authority: FCC
- Facility ID: 63193
- Class: C3
- ERP: 2,250 watts horizontal; 2,150 watts vertical
- HAAT: 189 meters (620 ft)
- Transmitter coordinates: 44.973°N 72.075°W

Links
- Public license information: Public file; LMS
- Webcast: Listen live
- Website: moo92.com

WMOO (92.1 FM; "Moo 92") is a contemporary hit radio formatted radio station broadcasting from Derby Center, Vermont, United States. It is owned by Vermont Broadcast Associates, Inc.; under a local marketing agreement, Russ Ingalls' Green Mountain Broadcasters LLC operates WMOO pending a full acquisition. The station's main transmitter is near the intersection of Hidden Pines Drive and Nelson Hill Road in the town of Derby, approximately 1.5 mi (2 km) south of the border with Quebec, Canada, allowing a city-grade signal as far north as Magog and a coverage area extending to north of Sherbrooke. It was rebroadcast on W257AU 99.3 in St. Johnsbury, until the translator's license was cancelled by the Federal Communications Commission on August 8, 2017.

The station broadcasts a weekday morning program The Moo 92 Wake Up Crew. The show is sometimes broadcast from local nursing homes, food shelves, and local fire departments. The syndicated live Liveline with Mason Kelter airs every weeknight.

== History ==
WMOO, along with 29 other Nassau Broadcasting Partners stations in northern New England, was purchased at bankruptcy auction by Carlisle Capital Corporation, a company controlled by Bill Binnie (owner of WBIN-TV in Derry, New Hampshire), on May 22, 2012. The station, and 12 of the other stations, were then acquired by Vertical Capital Partners, controlled by Jeff Shapiro. Vertical, in turn, would resell WMOO and WIKE to Vermont Broadcast Associates.

The sale of WMOO and the other 12 stations was consummated on November 30, 2012, at a purchase price of $4.4 million. The resale of WMOO and WIKE was consummated on January 1, 2013, at a purchase price of $760,000.

In February 2025, Bruce James agreed to sell the seven Vermont Broadcast Associates stations to Green Mountain Broadcasters, owned by Vermont state senator Russ Ingalls, for $996,000. Green Mountain then began managing the stations under a local marketing agreement.
