= Northeast Kingdom Human Services =

Social services provider in Vermont, U.S.

The Northeast Kingdom Human Services (NKHS) is a US Government Contractor which is tasked with providing social services to people in the Northeast Kingdom, Vermont. These services include help with: chronic mental illness, developmental disabilities, substance abuse problems and other mental health and medical psychiatric needs.

It employed 480 workers in 2009. It had offices in Newport and St. Johnsbury.

In 2013, 200 employees moved to a 30,000 square feet (2,800 m^{2}) facility in Derby.
