= WGMT =

- Lyndon, Vermont; United States
- Broadcast area: Caledonia and Southern Essex County, Vermont
- Frequency: 97.7 MHz
- Branding: Magic 97.7

Programming
- Format: Hot adult contemporary
- Affiliations: NBC News Radio; Compass Media Networks; Premiere Networks; United Stations Radio Networks

Ownership
- Owner: Vermont Broadcast Associates, Inc.
- Operator: Green Mountain Broadcasters LLC

History
- First air date: May 19, 1990; 35 years ago

Technical information
- Licensing authority: FCC
- Facility ID: 69938
- Class: C3
- ERP: 600 watts
- HAAT: 574 meters (1,883 ft)
- Transmitter coordinates: 44°34′15.1″N 71°53′38.3″W

Links
- Public license information: Public file; LMS
- Webcast: Listen live
- Website: magic977.com

WGMT (97.7 FM) is a radio station broadcasting a hot adult contemporary format. Licensed to Lyndon, Vermont, United States, the station is owned by Vermont Broadcast Associates, Inc. Under a local marketing agreement, Russ Ingalls' Green Mountain Broadcasters LLC operates WGMT pending a full acquisition.

== History ==
In February 2025, Bruce James agreed to sell the seven Vermont Broadcast Associates stations to Green Mountain Broadcasters, owned by Vermont state senator Russ Ingalls, for $996,000. Green Mountain then began managing the stations under a local marketing agreement.
