= Russ Ingalls =

American politician

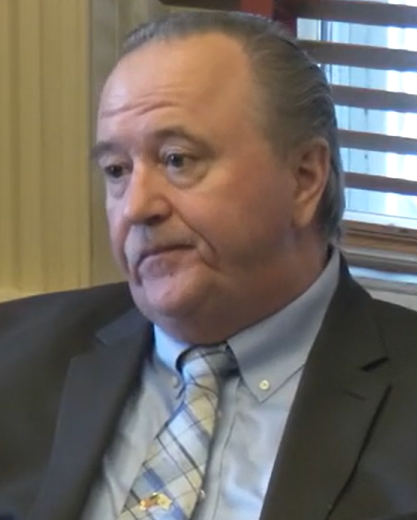
- Ingalls in 2025

Member of the Vermont Senate
- Incumbent
- Assumed office January 6, 2021
- Preceded by: John S. Rodgers
- Constituency: Essex and Orleans district (2021–2023); Essex district (2023–present)

Personal details
- Born: 1964 (age 61–62) Japan
- Party: Republican
- Education: Vermont Technical College (AS)

Russ Ingalls (born 1964) is an American politician from the state of Vermont. A member of the Republican Party, he has represented the Essex-Orleans district in the Vermont Senate since 2021. In 2022, he was reelected to the newly created Essex district. He previously served on the Irasburg Board of Selectmen. Ingalls is the clerk of the Senate Committee on Institutions and also serves on the Senate Committee on Transportation and the Canvassing Committee. He was born in Japan and spent much of his early life traveling with his father, who was in the U.S. Navy. He has worked in the dairy supply, real estate, and automobile sales industries.
