= Orleans County, Vermont =

County in Vermont, United States

- County
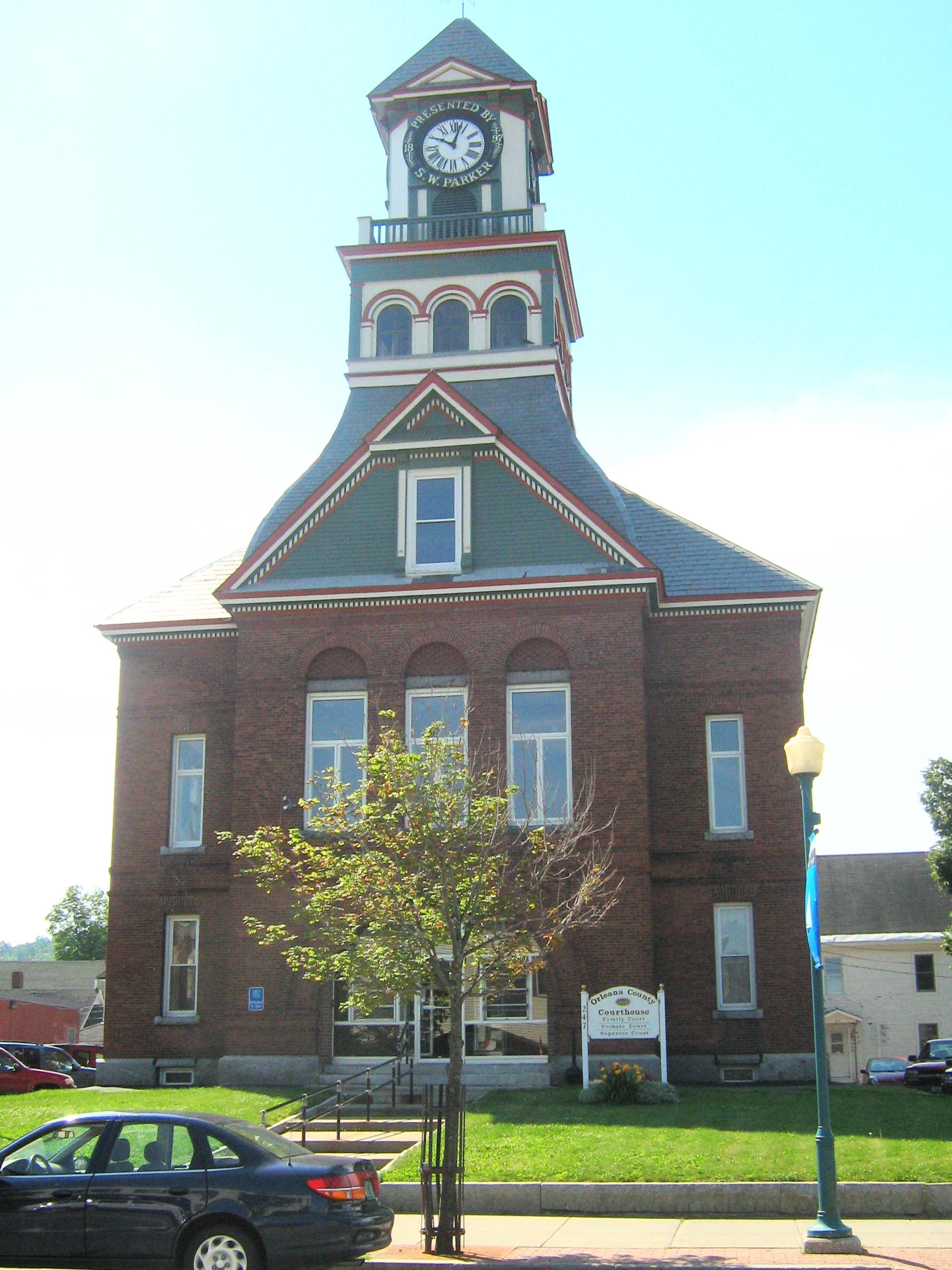
- Orleans County Courthouse in Newport (city)

- Location within the U.S. state of Vermont
- Coordinates: 44°50′40″N 72°13′06″W
- Country: United States
- State: Vermont
- Founded: 1799
- Named for: Louis Philippe II, Duke of Orléans
- Shire Town: Newport
- Largest city: Derby

Area
  - Total: 721 sq mi (1,870 km^{2})
  - Land: 693 sq mi (1,790 km^{2})
  - Water: 28 sq mi (73 km^{2}) 3.9%

Population (2020)
  - Total: 27,393
  - Estimate (2025): 27,600 ▲
  - Density: 39.5/sq mi (15.3/km^{2})
- Time zone: UTC−5 (Eastern)
  - Summer (DST): UTC−4 (EDT)
- Congressional district: At-large

Orleans County (/ɔːrˈliːnz/, ore-LEENZ) is a county located in the northeastern part of the U.S. state of Vermont. As of the 2020 census, the population was 27,393. Its shire town (county seat) is the city of Newport. The county was created in 1792 and organized in 1799. As in the rest of New England, few governmental powers have been granted to the county. The county is an expedient way of grouping and distributing state-controlled governmental services.

== History ==
The county shares the same pre-Columbian history with the rest of the Northeast Kingdom.

In 1753, the Abenakis brought the ransomed John Stark down Lake Memphremagog and came ashore where Newport is now. They then traveled southeast to his home in New Hampshire.

Rogers' Rangers were forced to retreat through the county following their attack on Saint-Francis, Quebec in 1759. To confound their avenging pursuers, they split up on the east shore of Lake Memphremagog. One group followed the Clyde River. Another followed the Barton River south to the falls at the outlet of Crystal Lake where they were able to catch fish. From there, they continued south over the summit into the Passumpsic River Valley.

The British Crown sent out surveyors to mark the border between its two colonies of Canada and America in accordance with the Quebec Act of 1774. This was supposed to be on the 45th parallel north. The result, however was a crooked line up to .75 miles (1.21 km) north of this intended border. This was resolved in favor of the crooked line by the Webster–Ashburton Treaty of 1842. This affected Orleans County, particularly Derby Line, which would have otherwise reverted to Canada.

In 1779 or 1780, General Moses Hazen constructed the Bayley-Hazen Military Road from Newbury, Vermont through Hardwick, Greensboro, Craftsbury, and Albany to Hazen's Notch in northern Vermont. This purpose of this road was to invade Canada. It was never used for that purpose, but was instrumental in the settlement of this area. However, it was five or more years before the wilderness was inhabited by other than a few Abenaki Indians, and that during the summer.

Vermont was divided into two counties in March 1778. In 1781 the legislature divided the northernmost county, Cumberland, into three counties: Windham and Windsor, located about where they are now. The northern remainder was called Orange county. This latter tract nearly corresponded with the old New York county of Gloucester, organized by that province March 16, 1770, with Newbury as the shire town.

The state granted a town to Ebenezer Crafts, and sixty-three associates, on November 6, 1780. The town name was changed to Craftsbury, in honor of Ebenezer Crafts on October 27, 1790. Crafts was the first settler in the county.

On September 3, 1783, as a result of the signing of the Treaty of Paris the Revolutionary War ended with Great Britain recognizing the independence of the United States. Vermont's border with Quebec was established at 45 degrees north latitude.

From 1791 to 1793, Timothy Hinman built what is now called the "Hinman Settler Road" linking Greensboro north to Derby and Canada.

On November 5, 1792, the legislature divided Chittenden and Orange counties into six separate counties, as follows: Chittenden, Orange, Franklin, Caledonia, Essex, and Orleans. No reason is given for the county name, but it is thought to refer to Louis Philippe II, Duke of Orléans (1747–1793), a cousin of Louis XVI who supported the French Revolution.

Orleans lost territory when the new Jefferson county was created in 1797.

In 1810, Runaway Pond suddenly flooded the Barton River Valley with 1,988,000,000 US gallons (7.53×10^{9} L; 1.655×10^{9} imp gal) of water in the greatest natural catastrophe in Orleans County post-Columbian history. Incredibly, there were no deaths.

On December 27, 1813, the county was invaded by British militia from nearby Stanstead, Quebec, during the War of 1812 in order to destroy an undefended barracks at Derby and to forage for supplies. No one was injured. Until the invasion, local inhabitants, like most New Englanders, opposed the war. A number had smuggled supplies to the British. After the invasion, their enthusiasm for their neighbors diminished substantially.

June 1816 brought 1 foot (0.30 m) of snow to the county followed by agricultural devastation. 1816 became known as the Year Without a Summer.

When Lamoille county was formed in October 1835, Orleans lost the towns of Eden, Hyde Park, Morristown, and Wolcott.

In 1858, Barton (and Orleans County) obtained a triangular piece of land from Sheffield (and Caledonia County) which included all of May Pond, the entire area south of Crystal Lake, and the village of South Barton.

By 1860, the state was a leading producer of hops in the nation. Orleans and Windsor Counties led the state. This crop conveniently arrived as a replacement for the disappearance of the Merino sheep trade. Hops, too, disappeared. A number of factors were involved: plant disease in 1909, migration of planting to California from 1853 to 1910, where growing was performed more efficiently, and Prohibition both at the state and national level.

During the Civil War, Company D, 4th Vermont Infantry was recruited largely from Orleans County.

Volunteers from the county joined the Union Army in response to a call from the government. In September 1861, they joined the Vermont 6th Vermont Infantry, and helped fill out Company D. The regiment ultimately became part of the First Vermont Brigade.

In 1864, 267 men from the 11th Vermont Infantry were captured at the Battle of the Weldon Railroad in the Overland campaign. today better known as the Battle of Jerusalem Plank Road. It was a considerable source of local concern when it was learned that these prisoners had been taken to Andersonville prison, a place known, even then, for its poor living conditions. 54 of these prisoners were from Orleans County. Many of them died in prison.

French immigration into the county started before the Civil War. It continued afterwards.

Like the rest of the state, Orleans County sent up to one-quarter of its eligible men to the Civil War. Ten percent of these died. Others came back too maimed to continue working their farms, which most volunteers had left. The sudden offering of many farms for sale in the mid-1860s resulted in a precipitous drop in farm prices. Nearby French-Canadians took advantage of this. As a result of this and loss of native farm labor to other states, Vermont, particularly the northern part, saw many immigrants then and through the turn of the twentieth century.

After increasing in population since its founding, the county began losing population starting in 1900. It reached a twentieth-century low in population in 1960 at 20,143. The population has risen ever since.

In 1903, the county purchased a jail, mail order. It housed about 350 people annually. It once held 140 people at one time, a fallout from a widely attended 1973 rock concert. The jail closed in 1995. It is listed on the National Register of Historic Places.

In 1903, a state law allowed each town to decide whether to permit the sale of liquor within their boundaries. By 1905, no town in the county allowed the sale of alcoholic beverages. The change was not that dramatic since state law had theoretically forbidden alcohol prior to 1903, but this law was unevenly enforced. Currently in 2017, the towns of Derby, Jay, and Westmore, the village of Orleans, and the city of Newport permit liquor sales through retail outlets supervised by the Vermont Department of Liquor Control.

In 1910, there were 2,800 farms in the county, containing 27,000 cows. They produced 15,000,000 pounds (6,800,000 kg) of milk annually.

In 1967, researcher and scientist Gerald Bull constructed a laboratory for hisSpace Research Corporation in Highwater, just north of the adjacent Canada–US border. The property overlapped into the county in North Troy. His intent was to fire research packages into orbit using heavy artillery.

In 2004, what was then billed as the final concert of the band Phish was held in Coventry on August 14–15. The concert was the single largest gathering of people in the town's history. With 70,000 tickets sold, Coventry's augmented population was one of the largest in the state's history.

The county has twenty-three places on the National Register of Historic Places.

In 2008, the state notified residents of Albany, Craftsbury, Irasburg, Lowell, Newport Town, Troy, Westfield and six towns in the adjacent counties of Lamoille and Franklin, that a review of health records from 1995 to 2006 had revealed that residents within 10 miles (16 km) of the former asbestos mine on Belvidere Mountain had higher than normal rates of contracting asbestosis. The state and federal government continues to study this problem. A critic replied that the entire basis of the study were three unidentified people who died from asbestosis 1995-2005 out of a total population of 16,700. In April 2009 the Vermont Department of health released a revised study which found that all of deaths related to the asbestos mine were caused by occupational exposure. The report also concluded that people living near the mines had no increased risk of asbestos related illness than people living anywhere else in Vermont. However, the site will still need to be cleaned. In 2009, the expected cost of cleanup was $300 million.

== Geography ==
According to the U.S. Census Bureau, the county has an area of 721 square miles (1,870 km^{2}), of which 693 square miles (1,790 km^{2}) is land and 28 square miles (73 km^{2}) (3.9%) is water. It has the largest area of the three counties comprising the Northeast Kingdom.

The county lies between the eastern and western ranges of the Green Mountains.

The highest point in the county is Jay Peak in the town of Jay, at 3,858 feet (1,176 m). The lowest is the surface of Lake Memphremagog at 682 feet (208 m).

The county is mainly drained by four river systems: the Barton, the Black, the Clyde, and the Missisquoi River. The first three run north. The last meanders west through Canada and the U.S. An exception is found at the southern end of the county: Greensboro, Craftsbury, and southern Glover are largely drained south and west by the Lamoille River. The county is unique in eastern Vermont for mostly draining north as a part of the St. Lawrence River basin. All Vermont counties directly to the south (and east of the Green Mountains) drain into the Connecticut River, as does much of Essex county, to the east.

The Barton River drains Crystal Lake, runs north through Barton, Brownington, Coventry and drains through Newport into Lake Memphremagog. The Barton River watershed also includes the towns of Derby, Irasburg, Westmore, and the water bodies of Lake Willoughby, Crystal Lake, and Shadow and Parker ponds.

The Black River is about 30 miles (48 km) in length. It rises in some ponds in Craftsbury, and passes through Albany, Irasburg, and Coventry. It reaches Lake Memphremagog at Salem. The watershed also includes Albany, Lake Eligo and the Hosmer Ponds.

The Clyde River has four hydroelectric dams before reaching Lake Memphremagog. The watershed includes Brighton (Essex County), Charleston, Morgan, Derby, Seymour Pond, Echo Lakes, and Island, Clyde and Pensioner ponds.

Additionally, the Canadian rivers of Coaticook and Tomifobia watersheds include Derby, Holland, and Norton Pond, Holland Pond, and Great and Little Averill Ponds.

The county contains more ponds than any other in the state.

The county contains three state forests: Hazen's Notch, Jay, and Willoughby.

=== Fauna ===
The area is conducive to songbirds because of its northern location, boreal forests, mountain peaks, bodies of water and marshes. One inventory in June 2012 found the following species: ovenbird, eastern whip-poor-will, Wilson's snipe, alder flycatcher, warbling vireo, red-eyed vireo, winter wren, wood thrush, American robin, veery, gray catbird, common yellowthroat, chestnut-sided warbler, northern waterthrush, black-throated green warbler, northern parula, American redstart, white-throated sparrow, indigo bunting, red-winged blackbird, American goldfinch, osprey, ring-necked duck, hooded merganser, pied-billed grebe, double-crested cormorant, great blue heron, bald eagle, Virginia rail, American herring gull, ring-billed gull, chimney swift, belted kingfisher, marsh wren, house wren, eastern bluebird, pine warbler, black-and-white warbler, Savannah sparrow, northern cardinal, eastern meadowlark, bobolink, bank swallow, cliff swallow, barn swallow, white-breasted nuthatch, ruffed grouse, ruby-throated hummingbird, blue-headed vireo, red-breasted nuthatch, Lincoln's sparrow, rose-breasted grosbeak, pine siskin, purple finch, Canada warbler, magnolia warbler, Nashville warbler, golden-crowned kinglet, mourning warbler, dark-eyed junco, and northern rough-winged swallow. Also known to be in the area were: wild turkey, American bittern, broad-winged hawk, peregrine falcon, pileated woodpecker, hairy woodpecker, scarlet tanager, American woodcock, Bicknell's thrush, blackpoll warbler, yellow-bellied flycatcher, broad-winged hawk, and Swainson's thrush. Also, the American crow, and kestrel. In 2013, a separate inventory added the common loon, chickadee, blue jay, Barrow's goldeneye, Lapland longspur, white-winged scoter, olive-sided flycatcher, red crossbill, Bonaparte's gull, and rough-legged hawk.

=== Climate ===
The average growing season is about 130 frost-free days in the Newport area. As this is the lowest point in the county, the growing season for other places in the county which are more elevated, is typically shorter.

Tornadoes have struck the county four times from 1950 to 1995, all rated F1, with one causing an injury. This level is 2.7 times below the national average.

On February 5, 1995, Jay Peak received 42.0 inches (107 cm) of snow, the greatest daily snowfall recorded for any location in Vermont.

==== Climate change ====
In the 20th century, the county was designated in hardiness as a Zone Three. Most plants that would normally be tolerant up to Zone Four, do well there in 2014; even some that are Zone Five. Growing seasons have been increasing by 3.7 days a decade since 1974.

=== Adjacent counties and municipalities ===
- Essex County - east
- Caledonia County - south
- Lamoille County - southwest
- Franklin County - west
- Brome-Missisquoi Regional County Municipality, Quebec - northwest
- Memphrémagog Regional County Municipality, Quebec - north
- Coaticook Regional County Municipality, Quebec - northeast

== Demographics ==
Historical population
Census	Pop.	Note	%±
1800	1,439		—
1810	5,838		305.7%
1820	6,976		19.5%
1830	13,980		100.4%
1840	13,634		−2.5%
1850	15,707		15.2%
1860	18,981		20.8%
1870	21,035		10.8%
1880	22,083		5.0%
1890	22,101		0.1%
1900	22,024		−0.3%
1910	23,337		6.0%
1920	23,913		2.5%
1930	23,036		−3.7%
1940	21,718		−5.7%
1950	21,190		−2.4%
1960	20,143		−4.9%
1970	20,153		0.0%
1980	23,440		16.3%
1990	24,053		2.6%
2000	26,277		9.2%
2010	27,231		3.6%
2020	27,393		0.6%
2025 (est.)	27,600	▲	0.8%
U.S. Decennial Census; 1790–1960 1900–1990; 1990–2000 2010–2018

An estimated 2,500 military veterans reside in the county.

=== 2020 census ===
As of the 2020 census, the county had a population of 27,393. Of the residents, 19.2% were under the age of 18 and 23.5% were 65 years of age or older; the median age was 46.3 years. For every 100 females there were 100.0 males, and for every 100 females age 18 and over there were 99.3 males.

The racial makeup of the county was 93.0% White, 0.5% Black or African American, 0.7% American Indian and Alaska Native, 0.4% Asian, 0.5% from some other race, and 4.8% from two or more races. Hispanic or Latino residents of any race comprised 1.7% of the population.

There were 11,698 households in the county, of which 24.7% had children under the age of 18 living with them and 24.5% had a female householder with no spouse or partner present. About 30.0% of all households were made up of individuals and 14.6% had someone living alone who was 65 years of age or older.

There were 16,376 housing units, of which 28.6% were vacant. Among occupied housing units, 75.2% were owner-occupied and 24.8% were renter-occupied. The homeowner vacancy rate was 1.6% and the rental vacancy rate was 8.8%.

Orleans County, Vermont – Racial and ethnic composition Note: the US Census treats Hispanic/Latino as an ethnic category. This table excludes Latinos from the racial categories and assigns them to a separate category. Hispanics/Latinos may be of any race.
Race / Ethnicity (NH = Non-Hispanic)	Pop 2000	Pop 2010	Pop 2020	% 2000	% 2010	% 2020
White alone (NH)	25,398	26,139	25,259	96.65%	95.98%	92.20%
Black or African American alone (NH)	88	152	127	0.33%	0.55%	0.46%
Native American or Alaska Native alone (NH)	170	116	197	0.64%	0.42%	0.71%
Asian alone (NH)	75	90	119	0.28%	0.33%	0.43%
Pacific Islander alone (NH)	4	9	1	0.01%	0.03%	0.00%
Other race alone (NH)	7	17	59	0.02%	0.06%	0.21%
Mixed race or Multiracial (NH)	345	403	1,169	1.31%	1.47%	4.26%
Hispanic or Latino (any race)	190	305	462	0.72%	1.12%	1.68%
Total	26,277	27,231	27,393	100.00%	100.00%	100.00%

=== 2010 census ===
As of the 2010 United States census, there were 27,231 people, 11,320 households, and 7,298 families residing in the county. The population density was 39.3 inhabitants per square mile (15.2/km^{2}). There were 16,162 housing units at an average density of 23.3 per square mile (9.0/km^{2}). Of the 11,320 households, 27.9% had children under the age of 18 living with them, 50.0% were married couples living together, 9.6% had a female householder with no husband present, 35.5% were non-families, and 27.8% of all households were made up of individuals. The average household size was 2.33 and the average family size was 2.81. The median age was 43.7 years.

The median income for a household in the county was $40,202 and the median income for a family was $48,845. Males had a median income of $33,979 versus $29,559 for females. The per capita income for the county was $20,652. About 9.8% of families and 14.3% of the population were below the poverty line, including 15.6% of those under age 18 and 14.2% of those age 65 or over.

== Government ==
As in all Vermont counties, there is a small executive function that is mostly consolidated at the state level. Remaining county government is judicial. There are no "county taxes."

In 2007, median property taxes in the county were $1,940, placing it 265 out of 1,817 counties in the nation with populations over 20,000.

The budget for 2006 was $428,612.51. Town taxes accounted for over 65% of this money. The budget was all fulfilled by the state. Almost 32% of the money was spent on courthouse personnel. Over 22% of the money was spent on the Sheriff Department's expenses.

=== Executive ===
The Assistant, or "Side," Judges, Superior Court, approve the budget for county expenses.

- Assistant Judge (elected) - Robert Goodby
- Assistant Judge (elected) - Benjamin M. Batchelder
- Road commissioners (appointed for one-year terms by the Superior Court) Citizens may appeal to this commission when they believe that a town has failed to properly maintain a road or a bridge.
  - Shawn Austin
  - Thomas Berrier
  - Dale Carpenter Jr.

=== Judicial ===
The Superior, Family and Probate courts are all located at 247 Main Street, Newport Vermont. The court system is part of the Northern Division.

The judge of the District Court is rotated to another county periodically. The state Supreme Court must approve assignments.

With one judge, the District Court can hear up to three jury-empaneled trials per month. In 2017, there were 40 people, pleading innocent, and awaiting trial.

Superior Court presiding judge (appointed by the state) - Howard E. VanBenthuysen

- Superior Court clerk - Gaye Paquette
- Court Operations Manager - Julie Bronson
- Case Manager- Sally Carruthers

Family court presiding judge - Robert R. Bent

- Magistrate - Barbara Zander
- Assistant Judges - Benjamin M. Batchelder and Curt Hardy
- County Clerk (appointed) - Susan Pion
- Probate Judge (elected) - Angela Ross

The District Court is located at 217 Main Street, Newport, Vermont, as is the State Attorney. The District court presiding judge is Howard E. VanBenthuysen. The Court Manager is Gaye Paquette. The State's Attorney (elected) is Farzana Leyva.

The sheriff's office is located at 5578 US Rte 5, Newport, Vermont. The sheriff (elected) is Jennifer Harlow. She was appointed originally by governor Phil Scott to fill the remaining vacancy from Kirk Martin, who retired.

The sheriff's department made national news in 2012, when a driver of a large tractor deliberately drove over and wrecked at least six cruisers, out of a fleet of 11. The driver was apparently annoyed at having been previously arrested by the city of Newport police, and not the sheriff.

=== Legislators ===
The Orleans Senate district includes most of Orleans County, as well as parts of Caledonia County and Franklin County. It is represented in the Vermont Senate by Samuel Douglass (politician) (R), who announced his resignation on October 17, 2025, effective as of Monday 20th, due to his participation in the offensive jokes made in a Young Republican group chat.

The Essex Senate district includes the Towns of Derby, Holland, and Morgan, the City of Newport, all in Orleans County, as well as parts of Caledonia County and Essex County. It is represented in the Vermont Senate by Russ Ingalls (R).

=== Elections ===
In 1828, Orleans County was won by National Republican Party candidate John Quincy Adams.

In 1832, the county was won by Anti-Masonic Party candidate William Wirt.

From William Henry Harrison in 1836 to Winfield Scott in 1852, the county voted for the Whig Party candidates.

From John C. Frémont in 1856 to Richard Nixon in 1960 (barring 1912, where the county was won by Progressive Party candidate and former president Theodore Roosevelt), the Republican Party had a 104-year winning streak in the county.

In 1964, Orleans County was won by Democratic Party incumbent President Lyndon B. Johnson, who became not only the first Democratic presidential candidate to win Orleans County, but to win the state of Vermont overall. Following Johnson's victory in 1964, the county returned to voting for Republican candidates for another 20 years, starting with Richard Nixon in 1968 and ending with George H. W. Bush in 1988.

George W. Bush won Orleans County in 2000, the only time the county would back a Republican between 1992 and 2020. Donald Trump narrowly lost the county by a margin of 26 votes in 2016. Trump would finally flip the county back to Republicans in 2024.

Normally voting among the most conservative counties in Vermont, the county overwhelmingly supported the Democratic presidential candidate in 2008 with nearly 63% of the vote. No town supported the Republican opponent. Nevertheless, the county elected only Republicans to the state senate and legislature and voted overwhelmingly for a Republican governor and lieutenant governor, yet Democratic for all other state offices. With one exception in the legislature for one district, the vote was not close for any office.

A record seventy-three percent of the voters turned out for the general election in 2000.

United States presidential election results for Orleans County, Vermont
Year	Republican		Democratic		Third party(ies)	
Year	No.	%	No.	%	No.	%
1880	2,911	77.79%	804	21.49%	27	0.72%
1884	2,476	75.03%	681	20.64%	143	4.33%
1888	3,036	73.55%	724	17.54%	368	8.91%
1892	2,358	76.34%	631	20.43%	100	3.24%
1896	3,412	86.25%	442	11.17%	102	2.58%
1900	2,749	85.24%	441	13.67%	35	1.09%
1904	2,563	87.30%	328	11.17%	45	1.53%
1908	2,535	85.30%	384	12.92%	53	1.78%
1912	1,475	36.37%	628	15.49%	1,952	48.14%
1916	2,758	71.58%	1,047	27.17%	48	1.25%
1920	4,400	84.99%	738	14.26%	39	0.75%
1924	5,006	85.18%	619	10.53%	252	4.29%
1928	5,561	80.65%	1,320	19.14%	14	0.20%
1932	5,132	66.40%	2,530	32.73%	67	0.87%
1936	5,038	65.26%	2,662	34.48%	20	0.26%
1940	4,480	57.52%	3,294	42.29%	15	0.19%
1944	3,801	58.86%	2,657	41.14%	0	0.00%
1948	3,775	62.87%	2,204	36.71%	25	0.42%
1952	5,830	74.19%	2,003	25.49%	25	0.32%
1956	5,344	72.26%	2,052	27.74%	0	0.00%
1960	5,027	59.98%	3,354	40.02%	0	0.00%
1964	3,009	38.05%	4,898	61.95%	0	0.00%
1968	4,055	56.97%	2,762	38.80%	301	4.23%
1972	4,906	63.21%	2,793	35.98%	63	0.81%
1976	4,075	52.30%	3,561	45.71%	155	1.99%
1980	4,473	48.69%	3,671	39.96%	1,043	11.35%
1984	5,966	63.53%	3,294	35.08%	131	1.39%
1988	5,257	54.70%	4,224	43.95%	130	1.35%
1992	3,572	31.03%	4,721	41.01%	3,220	27.97%
1996	3,114	31.18%	5,137	51.44%	1,735	17.37%
2000	5,799	47.80%	5,472	45.10%	861	7.10%
2004	5,666	46.28%	6,330	51.71%	246	2.01%
2008	4,482	35.10%	7,998	62.63%	291	2.28%
2012	4,306	36.83%	7,117	60.87%	269	2.30%
2016	5,159	42.83%	5,185	43.04%	1,702	14.13%
2020	6,512	46.20%	7,147	50.70%	437	3.10%
2024	7,233	48.99%	7,006	47.45%	526	3.56%

== Economy ==
=== Households and housing ===
In 2008, one-third of residential housing were used as second homes.

=== Personal income ===
The poverty rate for Orleans County was highest in Vermont for 2003. Median wages were the second lowest in the state. In 2011, 23.1% of residents received food stamps. This compares with 15.2% for Vermont, and 14.8% nationally.

=== Unemployment ===
In March 2008, the unemployment rate was 9.1% seasonally uncorrected, the highest in the state, which averaged 5.3%.

=== Business and industry ===
There were 838 private non-farm establishments, employing 7,392 people. In 2002, there was $238 million manufacturer's shipments. That year, the county had $240 million in retail sales. Retail sales per capita were $9,000. 24% of firms were owned by women.

In 2003, there were 194 dairy farms in the county. This was the third largest number in the state. In March 2010, the number of dairy farms had declined to 139. In March 2007 county farms produced 29,585,000 pounds (13,420,000 kg) of milk. The total number of farms increased between 1992 and 2007. Total area farmed decreased from 149,503 acres (60,502 ha) in 1992 to 130,308 acres (52,734 ha) in 2007.

For forest products, from 1988 to 2004, Orleans County showed the greatest employment increase in the state.

==== Retail ====
Many of the county's retail shops are concentrated both in downtown Newport and along the Newport-Derby Road (U.S. Route 5 and Vermont Route 105), one of the two state-maintained roads connecting Newport city to Interstate 91. The villages of Barton and Orleans also have a smaller concentration of stores.

There are seven pharmacies in the county, all but one of which is a regional or national chain.

There are two regional chain supermarkets in the county and there are locally owned grocery stores in several other towns as well.

Many of the smaller towns still feature a general store in the center of town.

=== Tourism ===
The county is tied for first place in Vermont with the highest percentage of second home ownership.

== Education ==
78.2% of residents had at least a high school education. 16.1% had at least an undergraduate degree.

School districts include:

- North Country Supervisory Union
- Orleans Central Supervisory Union
- Orleans Southwest Supervisory Union

There are three public high schools in the county: North Country Union High School (1063 students), Lake Region Union High School (396), and Craftsbury Academy (59). Wheeler Mountain Academy, grades 7–12, aids students who have emotional, behavioral or learning challenges. 15 are enrolled. United Christian Academy is a private religious school K-12, enrolling 108 students.

In 2007, the juniors in three public secondary schools in three different schools districts, North Country, Lake Region, and Craftsbury, scored lower than the state averages on standardized tests with one exception. North Country scored better than average in reading. Areas tested were math, reading and writing.

In 2008, there was no correlation between the performance of students on the standardized New England Common Assessment Program tests and poverty (free lunch). The five wealthiest schools were among the ten worst performers; of the five poorest schools, three were among the top ten performers in the county. Schools in the Orleans Central Supervisory Union(the top four) appeared to outperform the North Country Supervisory Union (eight out of ten worst performing).

There are about 85 home schooled students in the county, grades 1–12.

The Northeast Kingdom Learning Services is a non-profit agency that provides a central clearing house for learning services. It is located in the village of Orleans.

The Central Orleans Family Education Center was established in 2002 to offer childcare, pre-K programs, after-school programs, and migrant education classes in the village of Orleans.

=== Higher education ===
The city of Newport is home to a branch of the Community College of Vermont which enrolls nearly 300 students. It awards an Associate's Degree for these undergraduate studies.

Craftsbury Common was home to Sterling College, an accredited four-year institution with nearly 100 students. It closed in 2026.

== Culture ==
There are thirteen libraries in the county, all of them 501(c) corporations. This includes two full-time libraries the famous Haskell Free Library in Derby Line and the one in the city of Newport. The rest often have one part-time paid librarian. Much of the staff are volunteers. One is endowed. The rest depend upon fundraising and municipal contributions.

With the French immigrants came their religion, Catholicism, which is the plurality religion in the county today. Formal dance included the galop.

== Health and public safety ==
About 75% of local adults in the county and nearby areas, are overweight or obese. Orleans is next-to-last in health in the state, the result of obesity, alcohol abuse, and smoking. There is a smaller opportunity to find a dentist or primary physician.

=== Organizations ===
- Orleans-Essex Visiting Nurses Association and Hospice - non-profit palliative care

== Media ==
=== Newspapers ===
- The Orleans County Record - published Monday through Saturday
- the Chronicle - published weekly in Barton
- The Newport Daily Express - published weekdays in Newport
- Newport Dispatch online-only news updated daily

=== Radio ===
- W243AE - 96.5 FM; Orleans (repeats WGLY-FM Burlington)
- WIKE - 1490 AM; 1 kW; Newport
- WMOO - 92.1 FM; Derby Center

=== Television ===
- W14CK - Channel 14; Newport. Former repeater of WWBI-LP Plattsburgh, New York; current programming unknown.
- NEK-TV - Channels 14 and 15; Northeast Kingdom Television, Newport.

Comcast is the cable franchise serving Newport and most of Orleans County.

Residents are also in the range of Sherbrooke, Quebec, Canada television stations CKSH-DT and CHLT-DT; however, Comcast does not offer these stations, though they carry CBFT-DT, CBMT-DT and CFCF-DT from Montreal.

== Utilities and communication ==
=== Communication ===
Fairpoint Communications supplies hard line telephone coverage for the entire county.

==== Cell phones ====
In 2007, AT&T bought out Unicel in Orleans County, and in the next year replaced Unicel.

Verizon Wireless covers Newport city and the south Derby-I-91 area. Mount Owls Head in Canada may provide "roaming" service of Canadian carriers in the North part of the county.

=== Broadband ===
- Broadband coverage as of 2006
  - Total Coverage = 86%
  - Cable = 52%
  - DSL = 44%
  - Wireless Internet Service Provider = 69%

== Transportation ==
=== Major routes ===
The opening of Interstate 91 north from Barton on November 9, 1972, and opening south from the county in 1978 affected the county in a similar way to the opening of the railway a century earlier. In 1980, the county registered its first population gain in a century.

The interstate has its northernmost five exits in the county. Two of them are in the town of Barton, servicing the villages of Barton (exit 25) and Orleans (26). The other three are in the town of Derby: the southernmost of those (exit 27) actually leads to Newport city a mile away, while exit 28 services the village of Derby Center and the shopping areas along Derby Road. The last exit, 29, which is located less than ¼ mile from the Canada–US border, leads to the village of Derby Line and the town of Holland.

The county has 1,041 miles (1,675 km) of state highway and class 1, 2 and 3 roads. 606 miles (975 km) of these are dirt roads (class 3). 141 miles (227 km) are unmaintained roads (Class 4). As in most of New England, the county government does not build nor maintain any roads.

Derby has the most road mileage, 102; Westfield the least with 31.

The county has ten traffic lights, six of which are in the city of Newport with the remaining four in Derby. All but one of them are along the concurrency of US Route 5 and Vermont Route 105.

- Interstate 91 - Barton to Derby
- U.S. Route 5 - Barton to Derby
- VT 5A - Westmore to Derby
- VT Route 14 - Irasburg to Coventry and Newport
- Vermont Route 16 - Greensboro to Westmore
- Vermont Route 58 - Lowell to Westmore
- VT Route 100 - Newport through Eden. One of the few good roads west/southwest from the county.
- Vermont Route 101 - Connects North Troy and Route 105 with Troy Village
- VT Route 105 - Troy to Charleston. Road east of Charleston was closed for a while due to flood damage from Tropical Storm Irene in 2011
- Vermont Route 111 - Derby to Morgan
- VT Route 114 - Goes through Morgan
- VT 122 - Glover southeast to Sheffield
- Vermont Route 191 - "Access Road", connects I-91, Exit 27, to the city of Newport
- Vermont Route 242 - connects route 101 in Jay, with Jay Peak Village
- Vermont Route 243 - Connects North Troy to Mansonville, numbered after Quebec Route 243 on the Canadian side of the border

=== Local community public and private transportation ===
The RCT (Rural Community Transportation), a non-profit organization, runs out of Saint Johnsbury and services Caledonia, Essex, Lamoille and Orleans Counties. For general use, there are four buses north and south during the week from west Newport city to Derby Center, and two buses each way on Saturday. The fare is US 25 cents.

=== Railroads ===
Washington County Railroad (The Vermont Railway System) - WACR has just recently been awarded a 30-year contract to operate the track running from White River Junction North through St. Johnsbury and Newport. Users ship freight on this route.

There are no stops in the county. A line once ran up the east side of Lake Memphremagog, but this line has been abandoned and in some cases, torn up for use as hiking trails. This crossed the line near Beebe. The line still in operation goes northwest to Canada through North Troy.

=== Airport ===
The county is served by the Newport State Airport. It contains two runways of 4,000 feet (1,200 m) each 05–23, and 18–36.

== Ecological concerns ==
The Nature Conservancy has acted to protect areas against development. Specific areas in the county include: May Pond, Barton, Wheeler Mountain, the north beach at Willoughby Lake, the Westmore Town Forest, the Willoughby Falls Wildlife Management Area, and the South Bay Wildlife Management Area (Memphremagog).

== Communities ==
=== City ===
- Newport (city) (shire town)

=== Towns ===
Most towns contract with the County Sheriff for policing.

- Albany
- Barton
- Brownington
- Charleston
- Coventry
- Craftsbury
- Derby
- Glover
- Greensboro
- Holland
- Irasburg
- Jay
- Lowell
- Morgan
- Newport (town)
- Troy
- Westfield
- Westmore

=== Villages ===
While incorporated villages may be separate census divisions, they are still part of the surrounding towns

- Albany - village of Albany
- Barton - village of Barton
- Beebe Plain - unincorporated village of Derby
- Derby Center - village of Derby
- Derby Line - village of Derby
- North Troy - village of Troy
- Orleans - village of Barton

=== Census-designated places ===
- Coventry
- Glover
- Greensboro
- Greensboro Bend
- Irasburg
- Lowell
- Newport Center
- Troy

=== Other ===
- Lindsay Beach
- North Derby

== Notable people ==
- John Gunther, author and part-time resident of Greensboro
- Henry M. Leland, machinist, inventor, engineer and automotive entrepreneur. Created and named both the original Cadillac and the original Lincoln. At one time he was president or Chief Executive of both divisions or companies. Born in Barton.
- Gilbert C. Lucier - last surviving Civil War veteran in Vermont. Died 1944 in Jay.
- Howard Frank Mosher, author of many books set in the Northeast Kingdom. Lived in Irasburg.
- William Hubbs Rehnquist, Chief Justice of the U.S. Supreme Court and part-time resident of Greensboro
- Theodore Robinson, impressionist landscape painter. Born in Irasburg.
- Wallace Stegner, Pulitzer Prize-winning author (part-time resident of Greensboro)
- William Barstow Strong, president of the Atchison, Topeka and Santa Fe Railway. Born in Brownington.
- Alexander Twilight, first African American to serve on a state legislature, and first African American to receive a degree from an American University. Lived in Brownington.

== See also ==
- Essex–Orleans Vermont Senate District, 2002–2012
- Historical U.S. Census totals for Orleans County, Vermont
- List of counties in Vermont
- List of towns in Vermont
- National Register of Historic Places listings in Orleans County, Vermont
