= Lindsay Beach =

Community in Orleans County, Vermont, US

Coordinates: 44.9708796°N 72.1887128°W

Lindsay Beach is a community located in Orleans County, Vermont. It is located north of Newport, Vermont, and east of Lake Memphremagog.
