= Birds of North American boreal forests =

The boreal forest or taiga of the North American continent stretches through a majority of Canada and most of central Alaska, extending spottily into the beginning of the Rocky Mountain range in Northern Montana and into New England and the Adirondack Mountains of New York. This habitat extends as far north as the tree line (replaced by the High Arctic tundra) and discontinues in mixed deciduous-coniferous forests to the south. The "taiga", as it is called there, of Eurasia occupies a similar range on those continents. Throughout the Northern Hemisphere, the boreal forest covers 2.3 million square miles, a larger area than the remaining Brazilian Amazon rainforest. Although it is largely forest, the boreal forests include a network of lakes, river valleys, wetlands, peat lands and semi-open tundra.

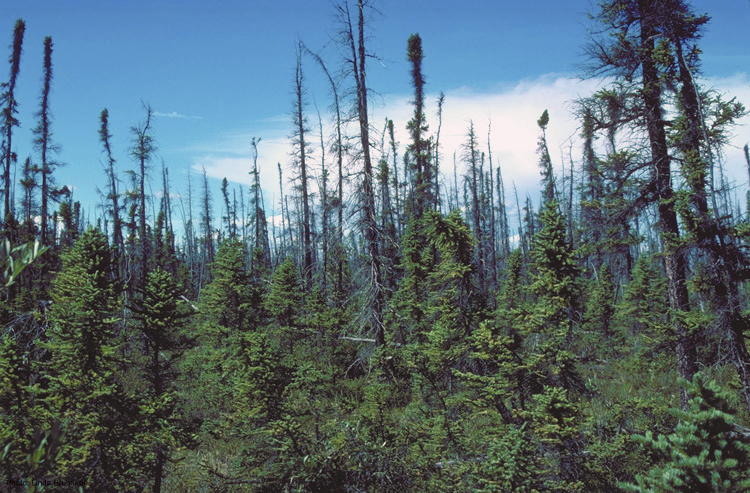
Black Spruce boreal forest, Copper River, Alaska.

Only 8% of the Canadian boreal forest is protected and over 30% has already been designated for logging, energy and other development, much of it within the last decade. The U.S. is the leading importer of Canadian wood products as well as oil and gas, having purchased 20 billion dollars (approximately 80% of Canada's timber exports) worth of Canadian forest products in 2001. Presently trees being logged in the Boreal are primarily pulped and turned into disposable products such as toilet tissue, junk mail, and catalogs. Decisions will be made in the next several years regarding the remaining lands and where development will take place.

Historically, this wilderness has long remained vast and little-known to birding and naturalist groups, who have placed their attentions southwards. Although, the wintering grounds of many North American migratory birds also requires attention, now it has become apparent that our attention must be focused north on the Boreal breeding grounds of many of these birds. It is estimated that about 60% of the American bird population found North of the Mexican border nests in the boreal forest. About half of North America's breeding species (over 300) make their home there. The following is a list of the North American birds reliant on the boreal forests.

== Birds almost totally dependent on the boreal forests ==
The following is a list (taxonomically organized) of the breeding species of which at least 70% of their North American population rely upon the boreal forest for nesting. If the boreal forests were cleared, these species would almost surely perish or be endangered.

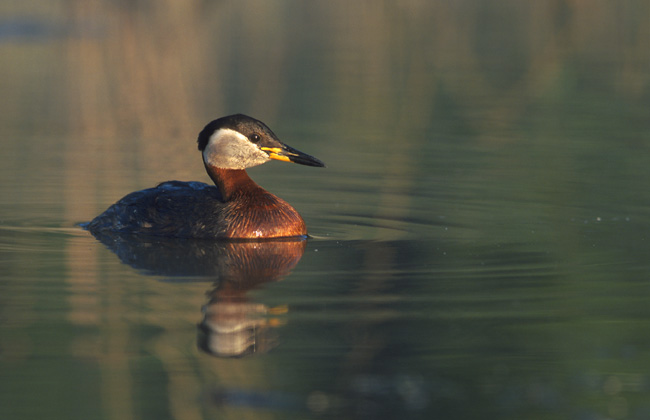
Red-necked grebe

- Surf scoter, Melanitta perspicillata
- White-winged scoter, Melanitta deglandi
- Black scoter, Melanitta americana
- Bufflehead, Bucephala albeola
- Common goldeneye, Bucephala clangula
- Spruce grouse, Falcipennis canadensis
- Common loon, Gavia immer
- Horned grebe, Podiceps auritus
- Red-necked grebe, Podiceps grisegena
- Whooping crane, Grus americana
- Greater yellowlegs, Tringa melanoleuca

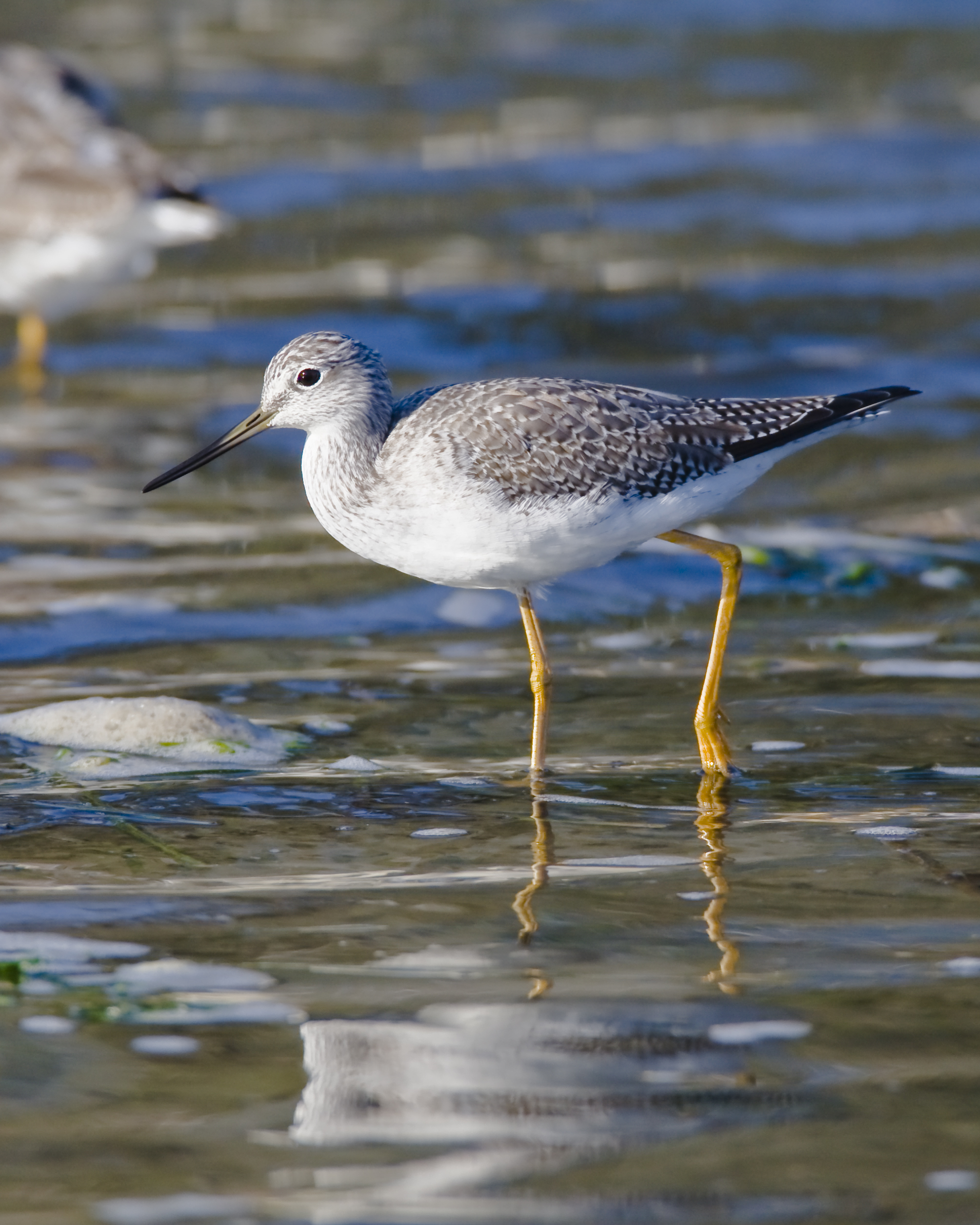
Greater yellowlegs

- Lesser yellowlegs, Tringa flavipes
- Solitary sandpiper, Tringa solitaria
- Wandering tattler, Tringa incana
- Spotted sandpiper, Actitis macularius
- Whimbrel, Numenius phaeopus
- Surfbird, Aphriza virgata
- Short-billed dowitcher Limnodromus griseus
- Common black-headed gull, Chroicocephalus ridibundus

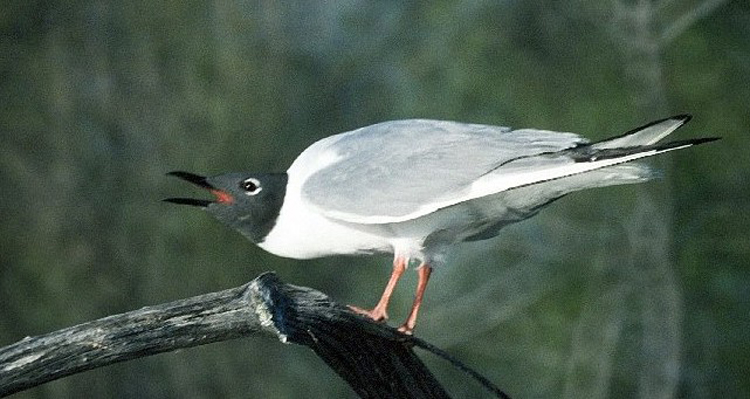
Bonaparte's gull

- Bonaparte's gull, Chroicocephalus philadelphia
- Herring gull, Larus argentatus
- Great black-backed gull, Larus marinus
- Common tern, Sterna hirundo
- Northern hawk owl, Surnia ulula
- Great gray owl, Strix nebulosa
- Boreal owl, Aegolius funereus
- American three-toed woodpecker, Picoides dorsalis
- Black-backed woodpecker, Picoides arcticus

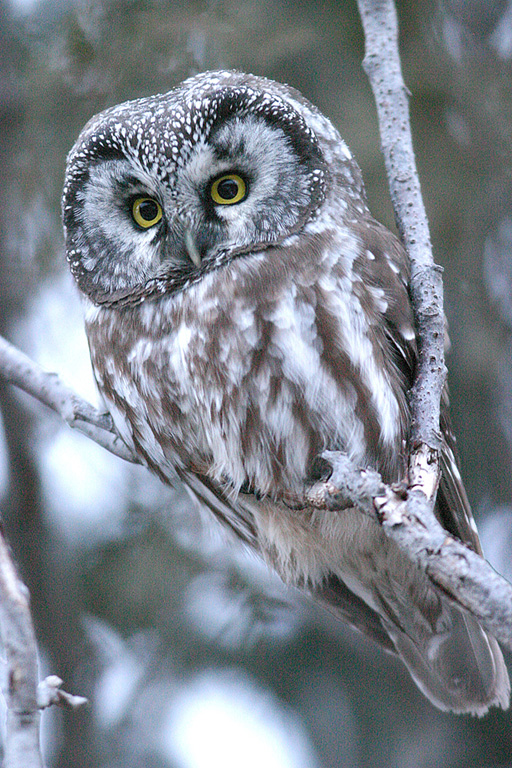
Boreal owl

- Yellow-bellied flycatcher, Empidonax flaviventris
- Alder flycatcher, Empidonax alnorum
- Northern shrike, Lanius excubitor
- Philadelphia vireo, Vireo philadelphicus
- Canada jay, Perisoreus canadensis
- Boreal chickadee, Poecile hudsonica
- Ruby-crowned kinglet, Regulus calendula
- Gray-cheeked thrush, Catharus minimus
- Bicknell's thrush, Catharus bicknelli
- Swainson's thrush, Catharus ustulatus
- Hermit thrush, Catharus guttatus

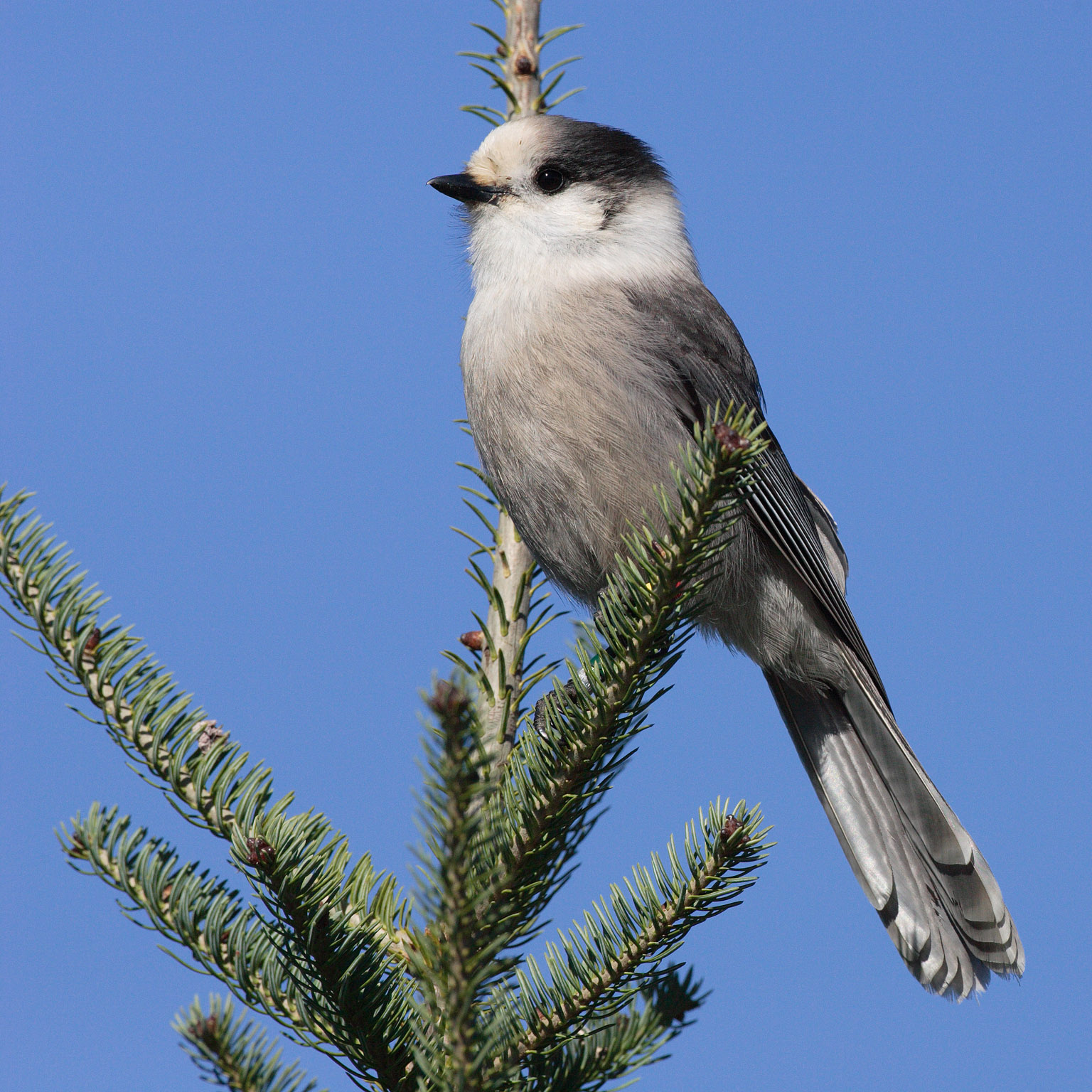
Canada jay

- Bohemian waxwing, Bombycilla garrulus
- Tennessee warbler, Oreothlypis peregrina
- Magnolia warbler, Setophaga magnolia
- Cape May warbler, Setophaga tigrina
- Yellow-rumped warbler, Setophaga coronata
- Kirtland's warbler, Setophaga kirtlandii
- Palm warbler, Setophaga palmarum
- Bay-breasted warbler, Setophaga castanea
- Blackpoll warbler, Setophaga striata
- Northern waterthrush, Parkesia noveboracensis
- Connecticut warbler, Oporornis agilis
- Mourning warbler, Geothlypis philadelphia

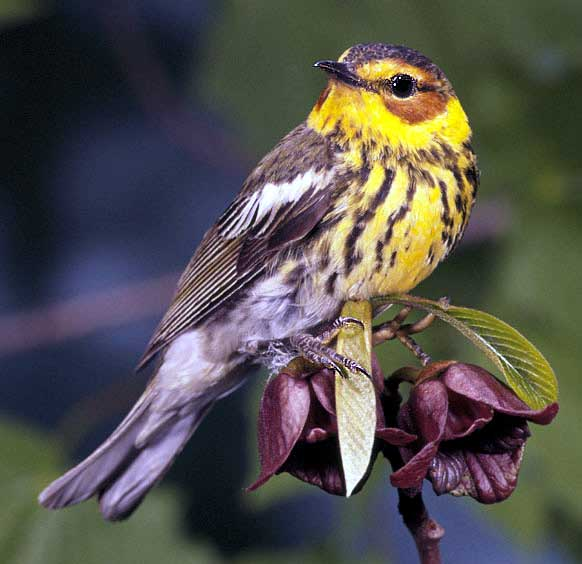
Cape May warbler

- Le Conte's sparrow, Ammodramus leconteii
- Lincoln's sparrow, Melospiza lincolnii
- Swamp sparrow, Melospiza georgiana
- White-throated sparrow, Zonotrichia albicollis
- Dark-eyed junco, Junco hyemalis
- Rusty blackbird, Euphagus carolinus
- Pine grosbeak, Pinicola enucleator
- Red crossbill, Loxia curvirostra
- White-winged crossbill, Loxia leucoptera
- Common redpoll, Acanthis flammea

== Birds that are very dependent on the boreal forests ==
These are birds that more than half of the North American populations nest in the boreal forest. Many of these birds need mature forests or isolated, non-populated wetlands that now have been largely cleared outside of the boreal forests.

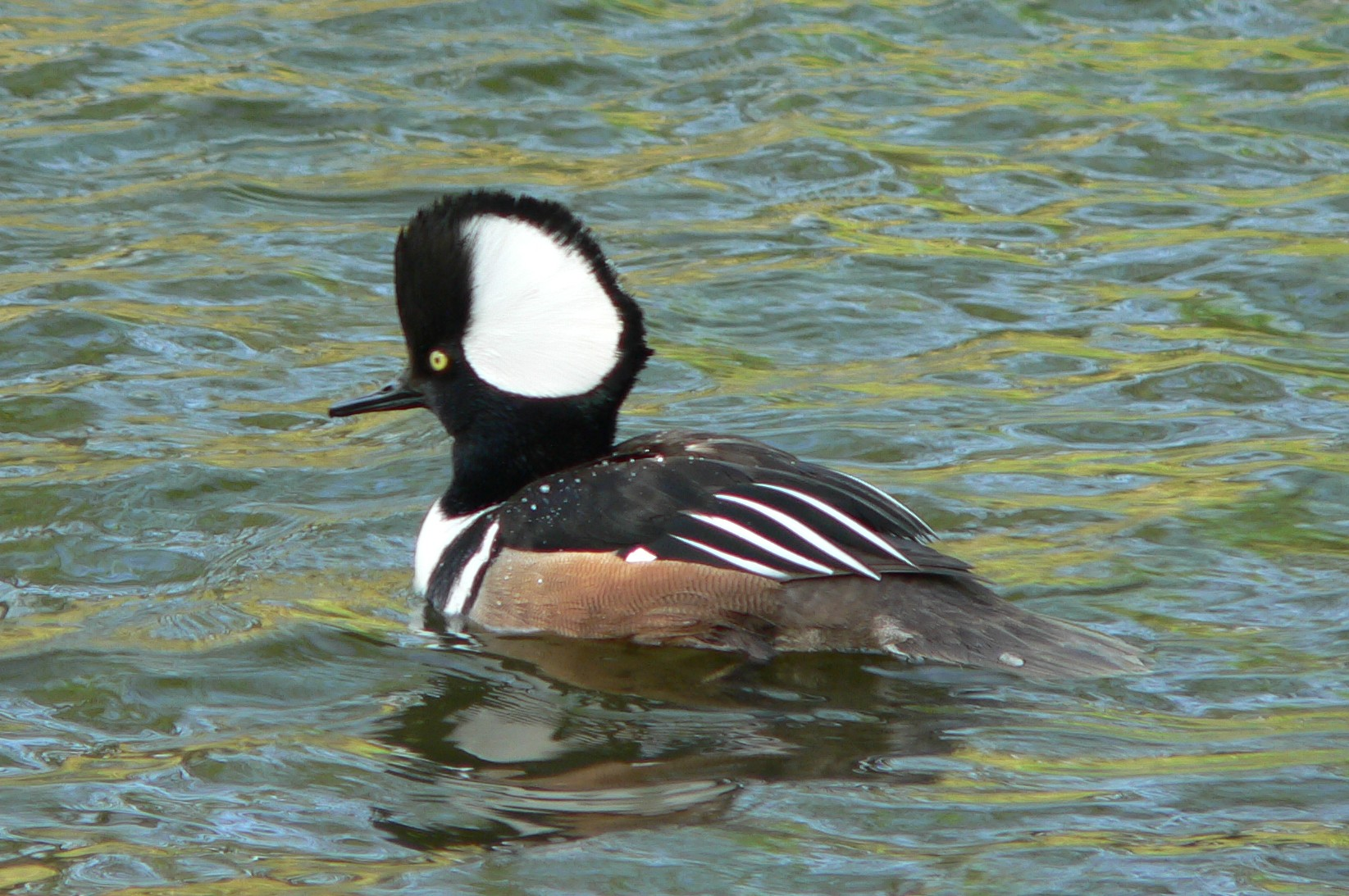
Hooded merganser

- Trumpeter swan, Cygnus buccinator
- American wigeon, Anas americana
- American black duck, Anas rubripes
- Green-winged teal, Anas crecca
- Ring-necked duck, Aythya collaris
- Greater scaup, Aythya marila
- Lesser scaup, Aythya affinis
- Barrow's goldeneye, Bucephala islandica
- Hooded merganser, Lophodytes cucullatus
- Common merganser, Mergus merganser

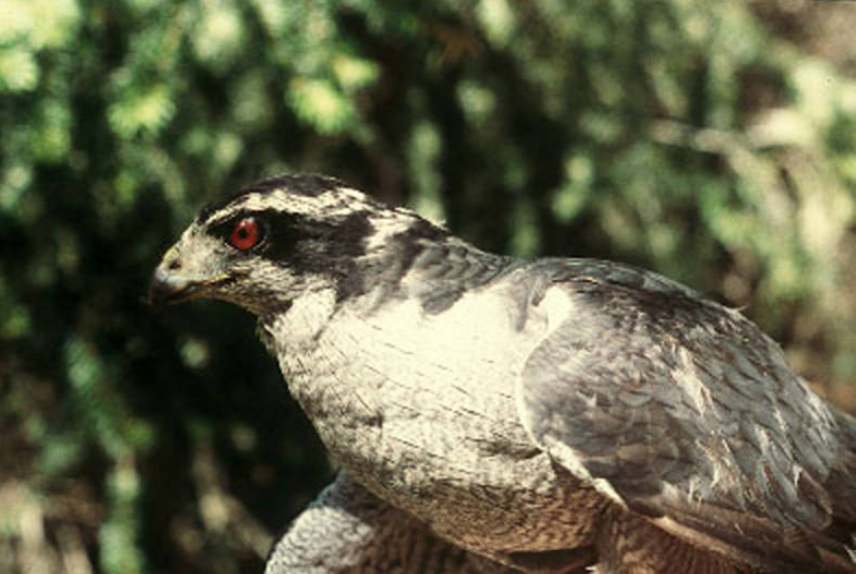
Northern goshawk

- Ruffed grouse, Bonasa umbellus
- White-tailed ptarmigan, Lagopus leucura
- Pacific loon, Gavia pacifica
- American goshawk, Astur atricapillus
- Merlin, Falco columbarius
- Yellow rail, Coturnicops noveboracensis
- Sora, Porzana carolina
- Semipalmated plover, Charadrius semipalmatus
- Hudsonian godwit, Limosa haemastica
- Pectoral sandpiper, Calidris melanotos
- White-rumped sandpiper, Calidris fuscicollis
- Least sandpiper, Calidris minutilla
- Common snipe, Gallinago gallinago

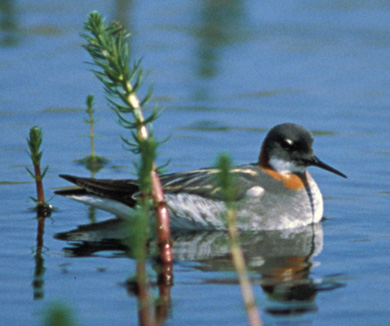
Red-necked phalarope

- Red-necked phalarope, Phalaropus lobatus
- Mew gull, Larus canus
- Ross's gull, Rhodostethia rosea
- Arctic tern, Sterna paradisaea
- Yellow-bellied sapsucker, Sphyrapicus varius
- Olive-sided flycatcher, Contopus cooperi
- Least flycatcher, Empidonax minimus
- Blue-headed vireo, Vireo solitarius
- Northern wheatear, Oenanthe oenanthe
- Orange-crowned warbler, Oreothlypis celata
- Nashville warbler, Oreothlypis ruficapilla
- Chestnut-sided warbler, Setophaga pensylvanica
- Black-throated green warbler, Setophaga virens

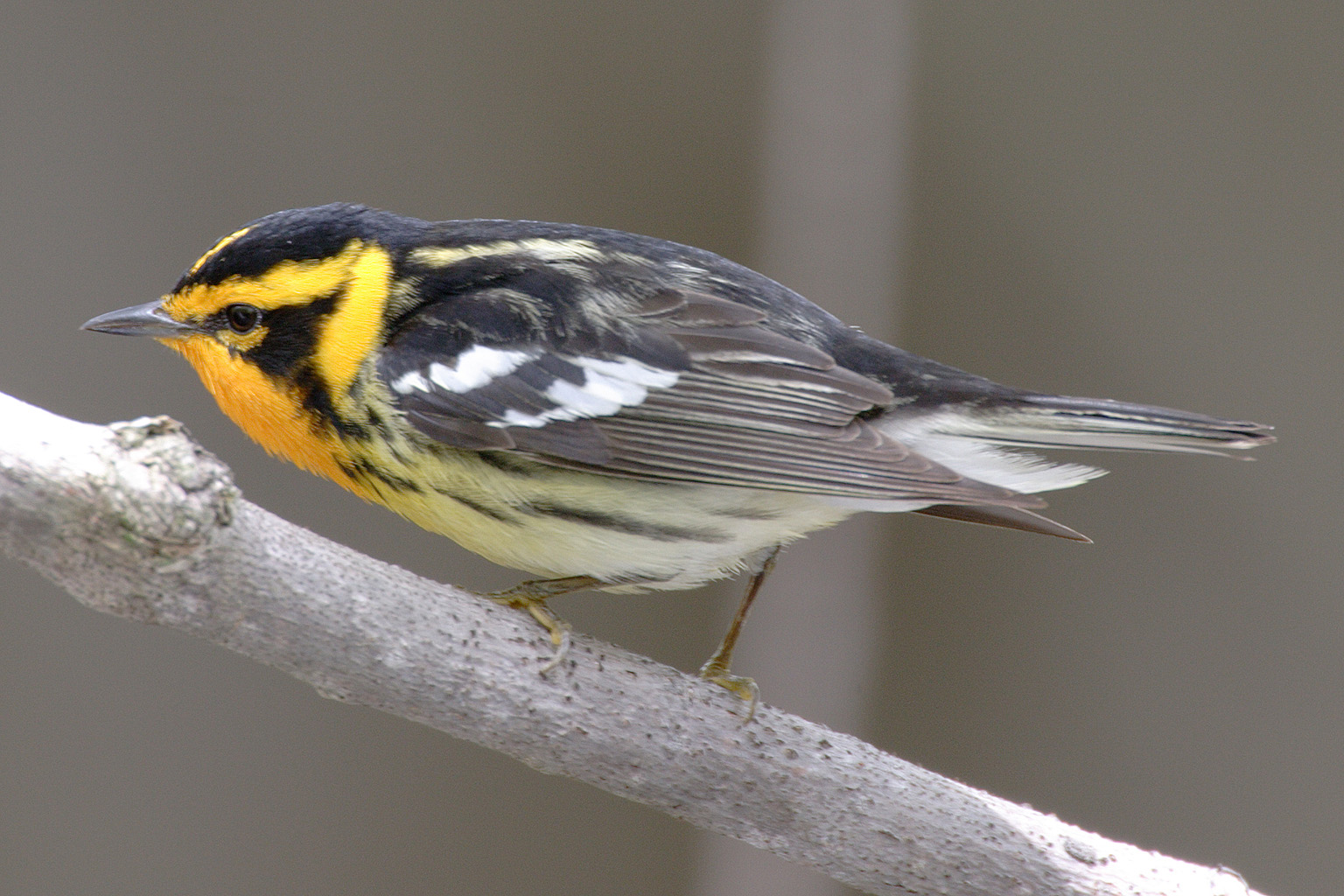
Blackburnian warbler

- Blackburnian warbler, Setophaga fusca
- Black-and-white warbler, Mniotilta varia
- Ovenbird, Seiurus aurocapilla
- Wilson's warbler, Cardellina pusilla
- Canada warbler, Cardellina canadensis
- Clay-colored sparrow, Spizella pallida
- American tree sparrow, Spizelloides arborea
- Fox sparrow Passerella iliaca
- White-crowned sparrow, Zonotrichia leucophrys
- Golden-crowned sparrow, Zonotrichia atricapilla
- Gray-crowned rosy-finch, Leucosticte tephrocotis

== Birds that are partially dependent on the boreal forests ==
Although less than half of the following birds' North American populations nest in the boreal forests, a major portion of their species is reliant on this habitat. Many of these birds are more often aquatic and woodland generalist than species more dependent on the taiga.

- Greater white-fronted goose Anser albifrons
- Snow goose Chen caerulescens
- Canada goose Branta canadensis

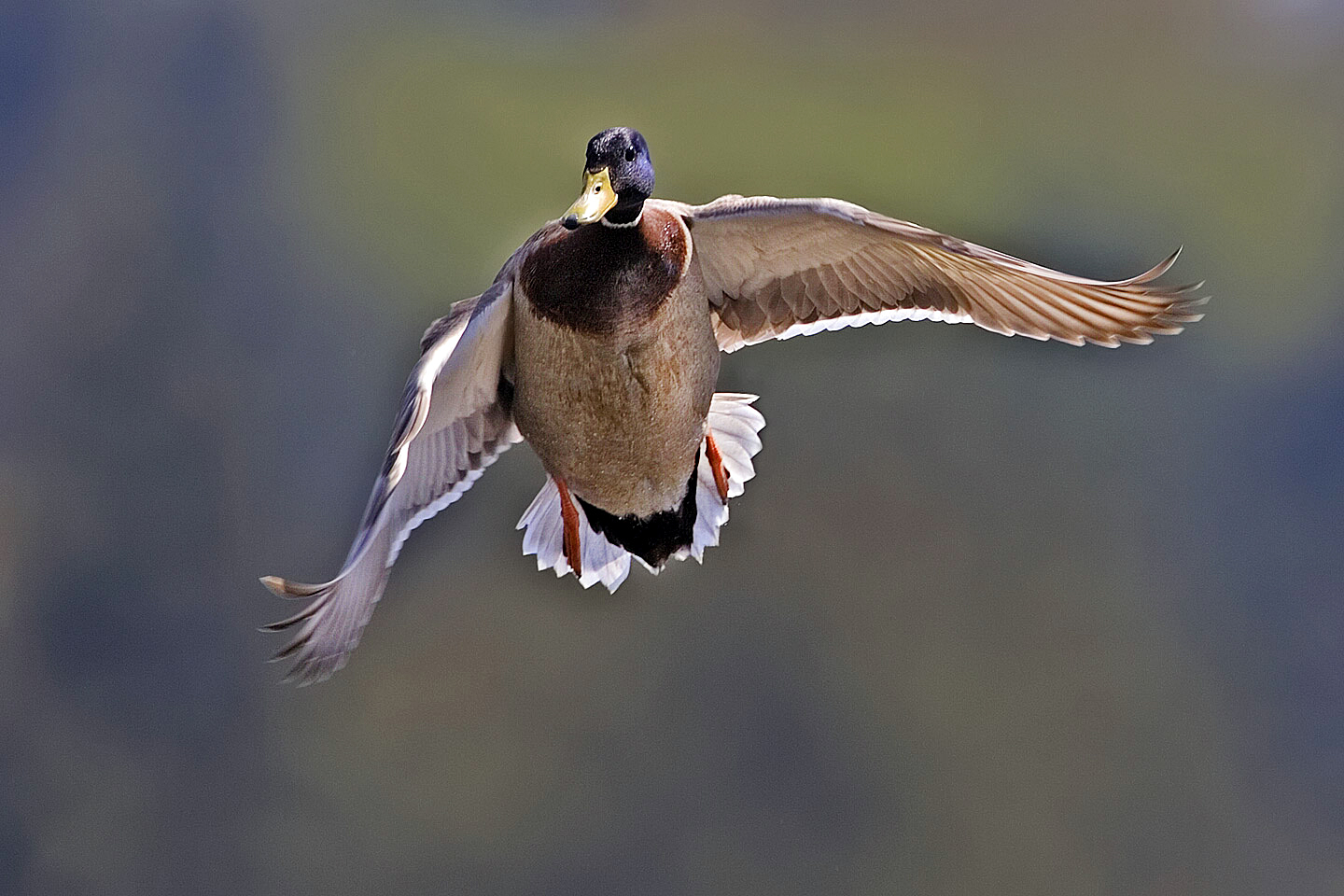
Mallard

- Mallard, Anas platyrhynchos
- Northern shoveler, Anas clypeata
- Northern pintail, Anas acuta
- Canvasback, Aythya valisineria
- Harlequin duck, Histrionicus histrionicus
- Common eider, Somateria mollissima
- Long-tailed duck, Clangula hyemalis
- Red-breasted merganser, Mergus serrator
- Willow ptarmigan, Lagopus lagopus
- Rock ptarmigan, Lagopus muta
- Arctic loon, Gavia arctica
- Red-throated loon, Gavia stellata

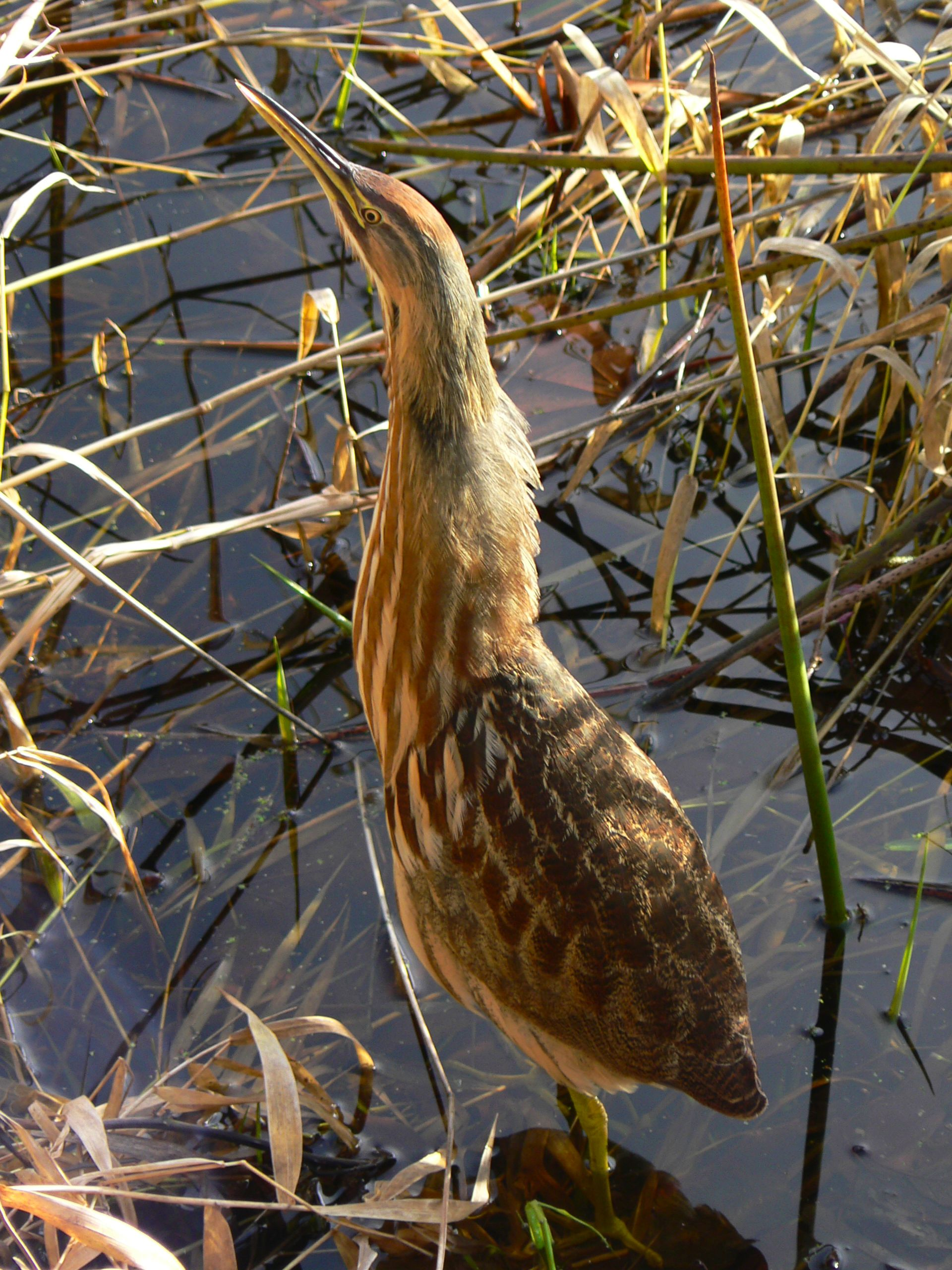
American bittern

- American white pelican, Pelecanus erythrorhynchos
- Double-crested cormorant, Phalacrocorax auritus
- American bittern, Botaurus lentiginosus
- Osprey, Pandion haliaetus
- Bald eagle, Haliaeetus leucocephalus
- Northern harrier, Circus cyaneus
- Sharp-shinned hawk, Accipiter striatus
- Broad-winged hawk, Buteo platypterus
- Swainson's hawk, Buteo swainsoni
- Red-tailed hawk, Buteo jamaicensis
- Rough-legged hawk, Buteo lagopus
- Golden eagle, Aquila chrysaetos
- Gyrfalcon, Falco rusticolus
- Sandhill crane, Grus canadensis
- Pacific golden-plover, Pluvialis fulva
- American golden-plover, Pluvialis dominica
- Piping plover, Charadrius melodus
- Rock sandpiper, Calidris ptilocnemis
- Western sandpiper, Calidris mauri
- Baird's sandpiper, Calidris bairdii
- Semipalmated sandpiper, Calidris pusilla
- Dunlin, Calidris alpina

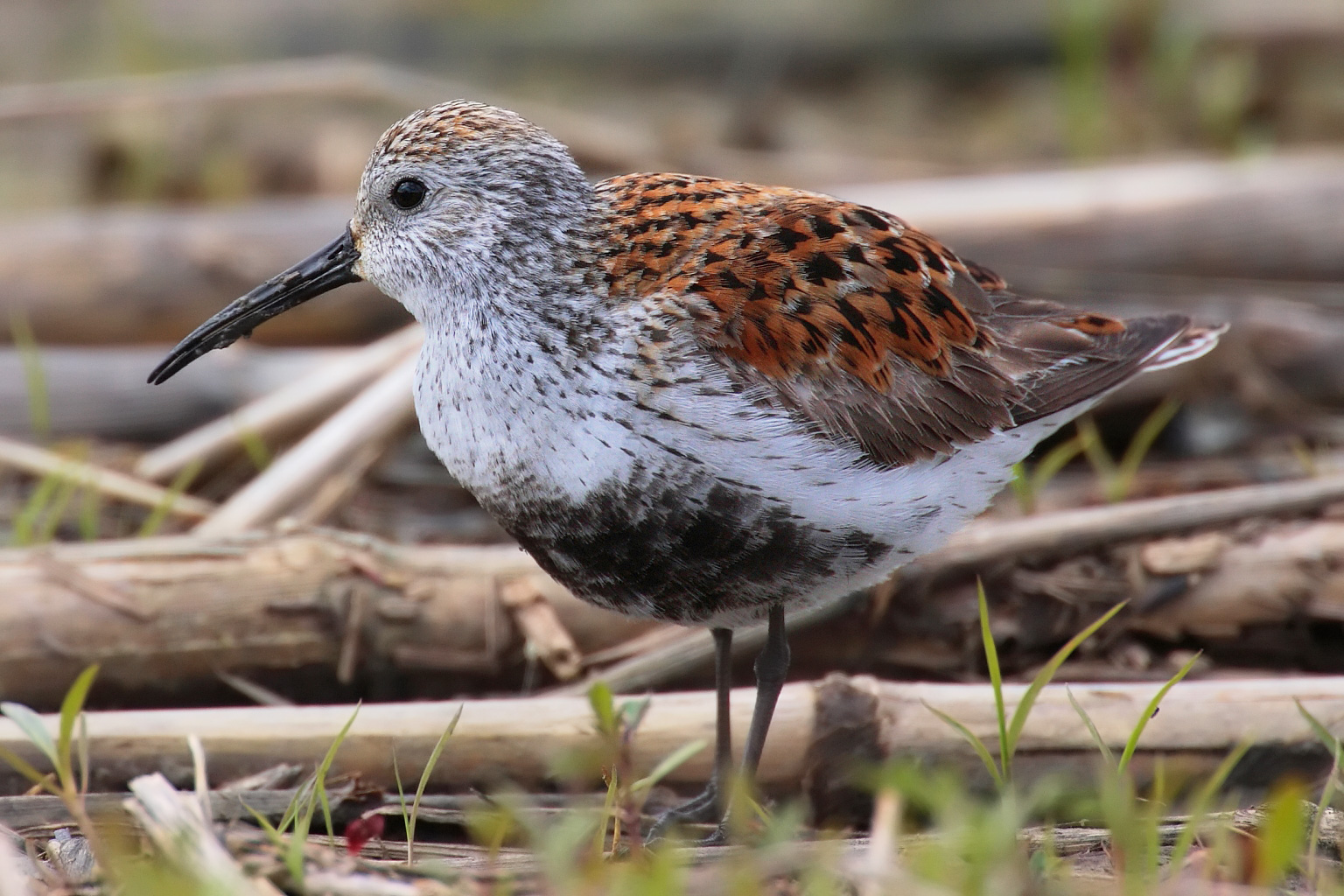
Dunlin

- Stilt sandpiper, Calidris himantopus
- Long-billed dowitcher, Limnodromus scolopaceus
- American woodcock, Scolopax minor
- Wilson's phalarope, Phalaropus tricolor
- Franklin's gull, Leucophaeus pipixcan
- Ring-billed gull, Larus delawarensis
- Black tern, Chlidonias niger
- Long-tailed jaeger, Stercorarius longicaudus
- Parasitic jaeger, Stercorarius parasiticus
- Black-billed cuckoo, Coccyzus erythropthalmus
- Great horned owl, Bubo virginianus
- Barred owl, Strix varia

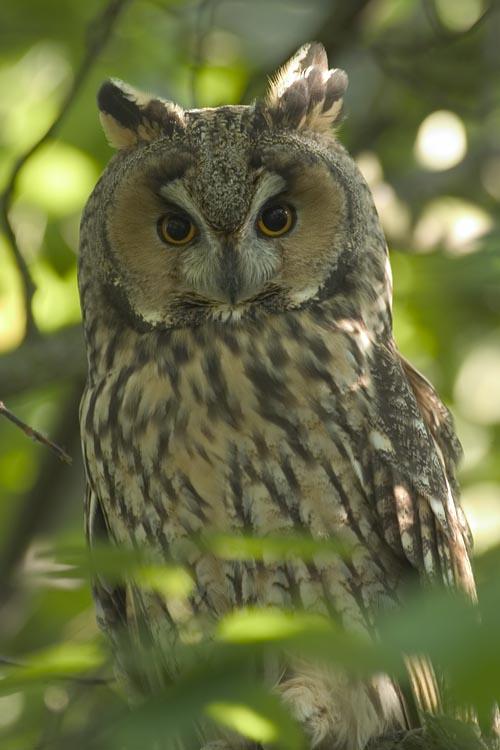
Long-eared owl

- Long-eared owl, Asio otus
- Northern saw-whet owl, Aegolius acadicus
- Belted kingfisher, Ceryle alcyon
- Hairy woodpecker, Picoides villosus
- Northern flicker, Colaptes auratus
- Pileated woodpecker, Dryocopus pileatus
- Western wood-pewee, Contopus sordidulus
- Eastern phoebe, Sayornis phoebe
- Eastern kingbird, Tyrannus tyrannus
- Warbling vireo, Vireo gilvus
- Red-eyed vireo, Vireo olivaceus
- Blue jay, Cyanocitta cristata
- Black-billed magpie, Pica hudsonia
- American crow, Corvus brachyrhynchos
- Common raven, Corvus corax
- Horned lark, Eremophila alpestris
- Tree swallow, Tachycineta bicolor
- Bank swallow, Riparia riparia

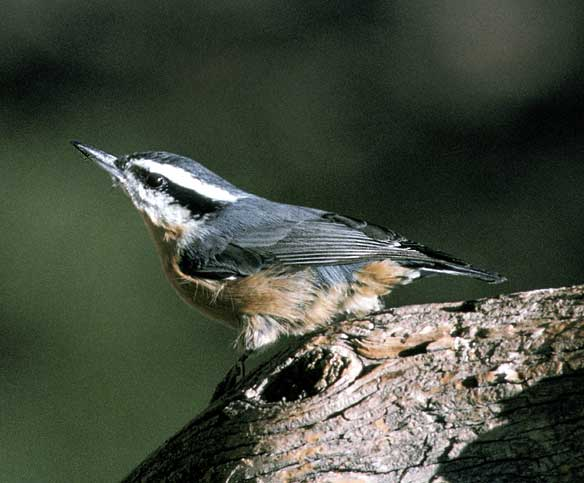
Red-breasted nuthatch

- Black-capped chickadee, Poecile atricapillus
- Red-breasted nuthatch, Sitta canadensis
- Brown creeper, Certhia americana
- Winter wren, Troglodytes hiemalis
- Golden-crowned kinglet, Regulus satrapa
- Arctic warbler, Phylloscopus borealis
- Veery, Catharus fuscescens
- Varied thrush, Ixoreus naevius
- American pipit, Anthus rubescens
- Sprague's pipit, Anthus spragueii

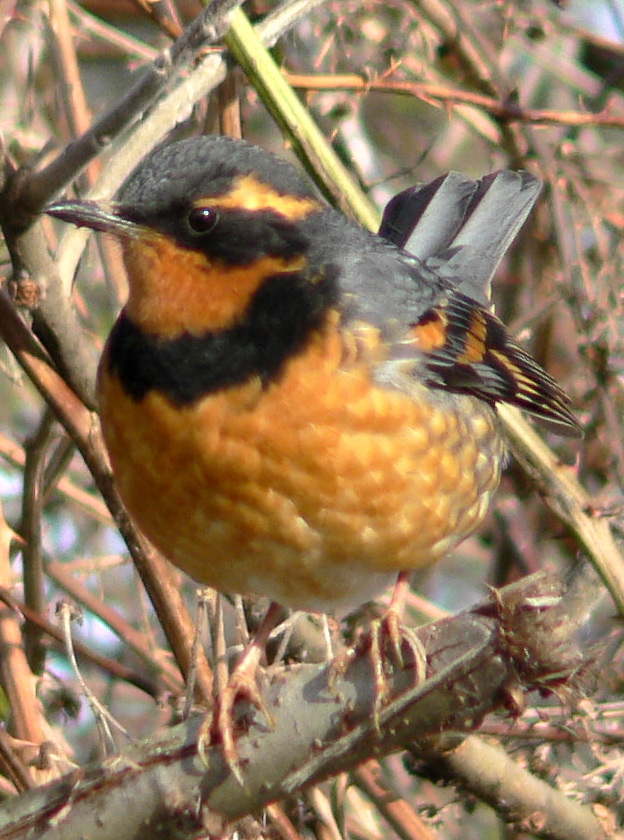
Varied thrush

- Townsend's solitaire, Myadestes townsendi
- American robin, Turdus migratorius
- Cedar waxwing, Bombycilla cedrorum
- Yellow warbler, Setophaga petechia
- Black-throated blue warbler, Setophaga caerulescens
- Common yellowthroat, Geothlypis trichas
- American redstart, Setophaga ruticilla
- Chipping sparrow, Spizella passerina
- Nelson's sparrow, Ammodramus nelsoni
- Savannah sparrow, Passerculus sandwichensis
- Song sparrow, Melospiza melodia
- Smith's longspur, Calcarius pictus
- Lapland longspur, Calcarius lapponicus
- Snow bunting, Plectrophenax nivalis

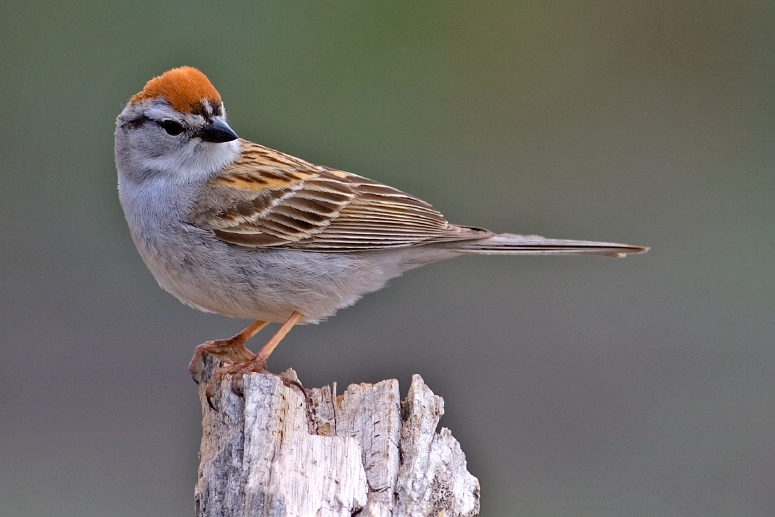
Chipping sparrow

- Rose-breasted grosbeak, Pheucticus ludovicianus
- Common grackle, Quiscalus quiscula
- Purple finch Haemorhous purpureus
- Pine siskin, Spinus pinus
- Hoary redpoll, Acanthis hornemanni
- Evening grosbeak, Hesperiphona vespertina

== Birds that are minimally dependent on boreal forests ==
These are birds usually at their fringe of their ranges in the boreal forest or that occur less frequently as breeders in the boreal forest because their ideal habitat is not included in the taiga.

- Ross's goose, Chen rossii
- Wood duck, Aix sponsa
- Gadwall, Anas strepera

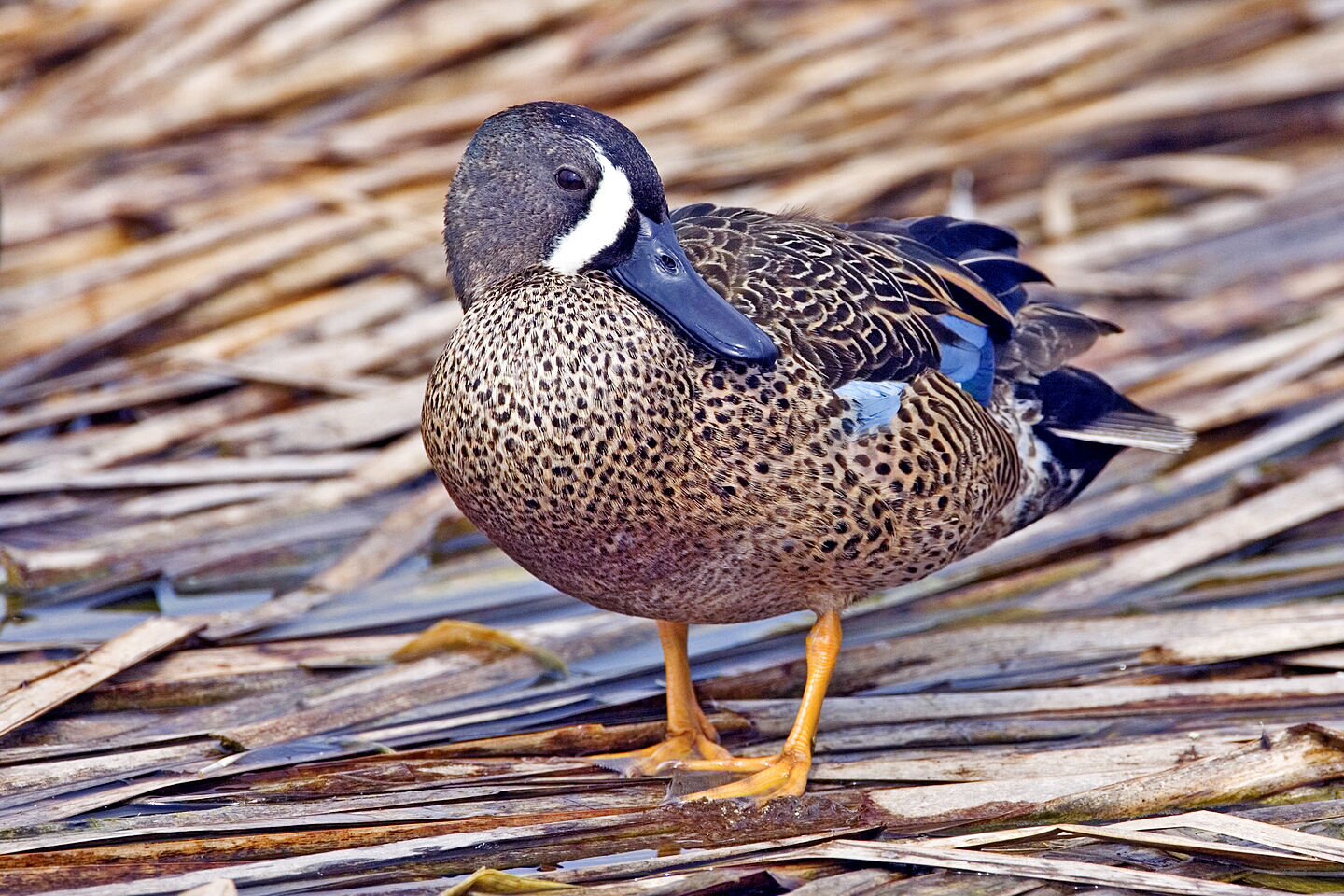
Blue-winged teal

- Blue-winged teal Anas discors
- Cinnamon teal, Anas cyanoptera
- Redhead, Aythya americana
- Ruddy duck, Oxyura jamaicensis
- Yellow-billed loon, Gavia adamsii
- Pied-billed grebe Podilymbus podiceps
- Eared grebe, Podiceps nigricollis
- Western grebe, Aechmophorus occidentalis
- Great blue heron, Ardea herodias
- Green heron, Butorides virescens
- Black-crowned night-heron, Nycticorax nycticorax
- Turkey vulture, Cathartes aura
- Tundra swan, Cygnus columbianus
- Cooper's hawk, Accipiter cooperii
- American kestrel, Falco sparverius

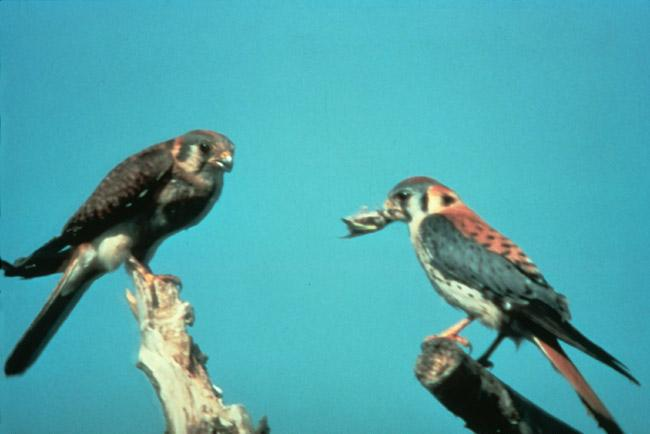
American kestrel

- Peregrine falcon, Falco peregrinus
- Sharp-tailed grouse, Tympanuchus phasianellus
- Gray partridge, Perdix perdix
- Ring-necked pheasant, Phasianus colchicus
- Wild turkey, Meleagris gallopavo
- Virginia rail, Rallus limicola
- American coot, Fulica americana
- Black-bellied plover, Pluvialis squatarola
- Killdeer, Charadrius vociferus
- American avocet, Recurvirostra americana
- Willet, Tringa semipalmata
- Upland sandpiper, Bartramia longicauda
- Marbled godwit, Limosa fedoa
- Bar-tailed godwit, Limosa lapponica
- Bristle-thighed curlew, Numenius tahitiensis
- Long-billed curlew, Numenius americanus
- Ruddy turnstone, Arenaria interpres
- Black turnstone, Arenaria melanocephala
- Buff-breasted sandpiper, Tryngites subruficollis
- Red phalarope, Phalaropus fulicaria

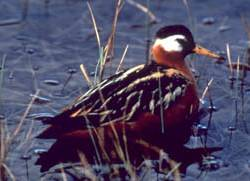
Red phalarope

- California gull, Larus californicus
- Glaucous-winged gull, Larus glaucescens
- Glaucous gull, Larus hyperboreus
- Sabine's gull, Xema sabini
- Caspian tern, Hydroprogne caspia
- Forster's tern, Sterna forsteri
- Rock pigeon, Columba livia
- Mourning dove, Zenaida macroura
- Eastern screech-owl, Megascops asio
- Snowy owl, Nyctea scandiaca
- Northern pygmy-owl, Glaucidium gnoma
- Short-eared owl, Asio flammeus
- Common nighthawk, Chordeiles minor
- Whip-poor-will, Caprimulgus vociferus
- Chimney swift, Chaetura pelagica
- Ruby-throated hummingbird, Archilochus colubris
- Rufous hummingbird, Selasphorus rufus
- Red-naped sapsucker, Sphyrapicus nuchalis
- Red-breasted sapsucker, Sphyrapicus ruber

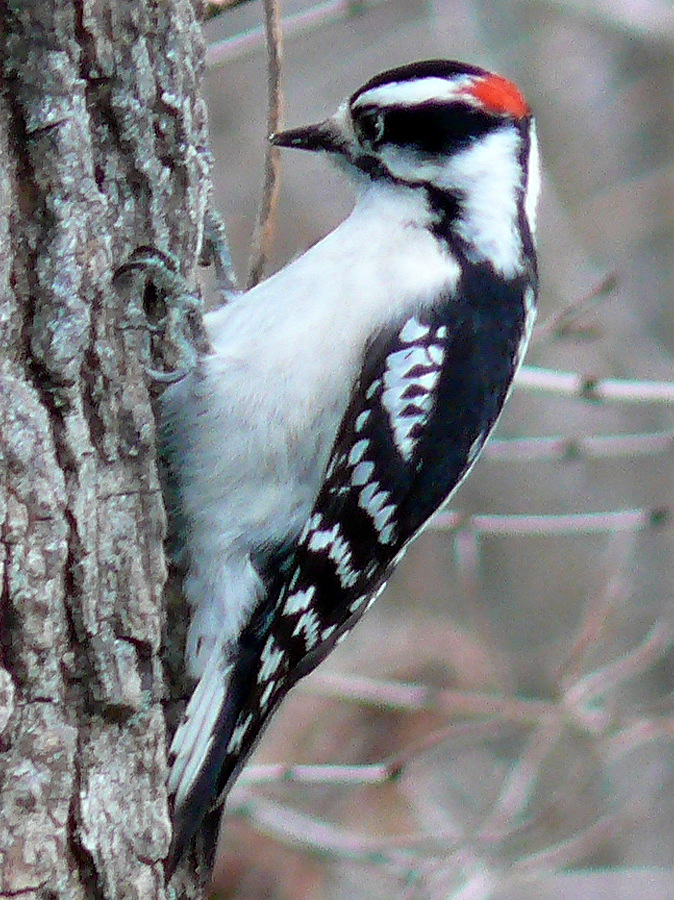
Downy woodpecker

- Downy woodpecker, Picoides pubescens
- Eastern wood-pewee, Contopus virens
- Willow flycatcher, Empidonax traillii
- Hammond's flycatcher, Empidonax hammondii
- Dusky flycatcher, Empidonax oberholseri
- Cordilleran flycatcher, Empidonax occidentalis
- Say's phoebe, Sayornis saya
- Great crested flycatcher, Myiarchus crinitus
- Western kingbird, Tyrannus verticalis
- Yellow-throated vireo, Vireo flavifrons
- Cassin's vireo, Vireo cassinii
- Steller's jay, Cyanocitta stelleri
- Clark's nutcracker, Nucifraga columbiana
- Purple martin, Progne subis
- Violet-green swallow, Tachycineta thalassina
- Cliff swallow, Petrochelidon pyrrhonota
- Barn swallow, Hirundo rustica
- Mountain chickadee, Poecile gambeli
- Chestnut-backed chickadee, Poecile rufescens
- White-breasted nuthatch, Sitta carolinensis
- House wren, Troglodytes aedon
- Sedge wren, Cistothorus platensis
- Marsh wren, Cistothorus palustris
- American dipper, Cinclus mexicanus

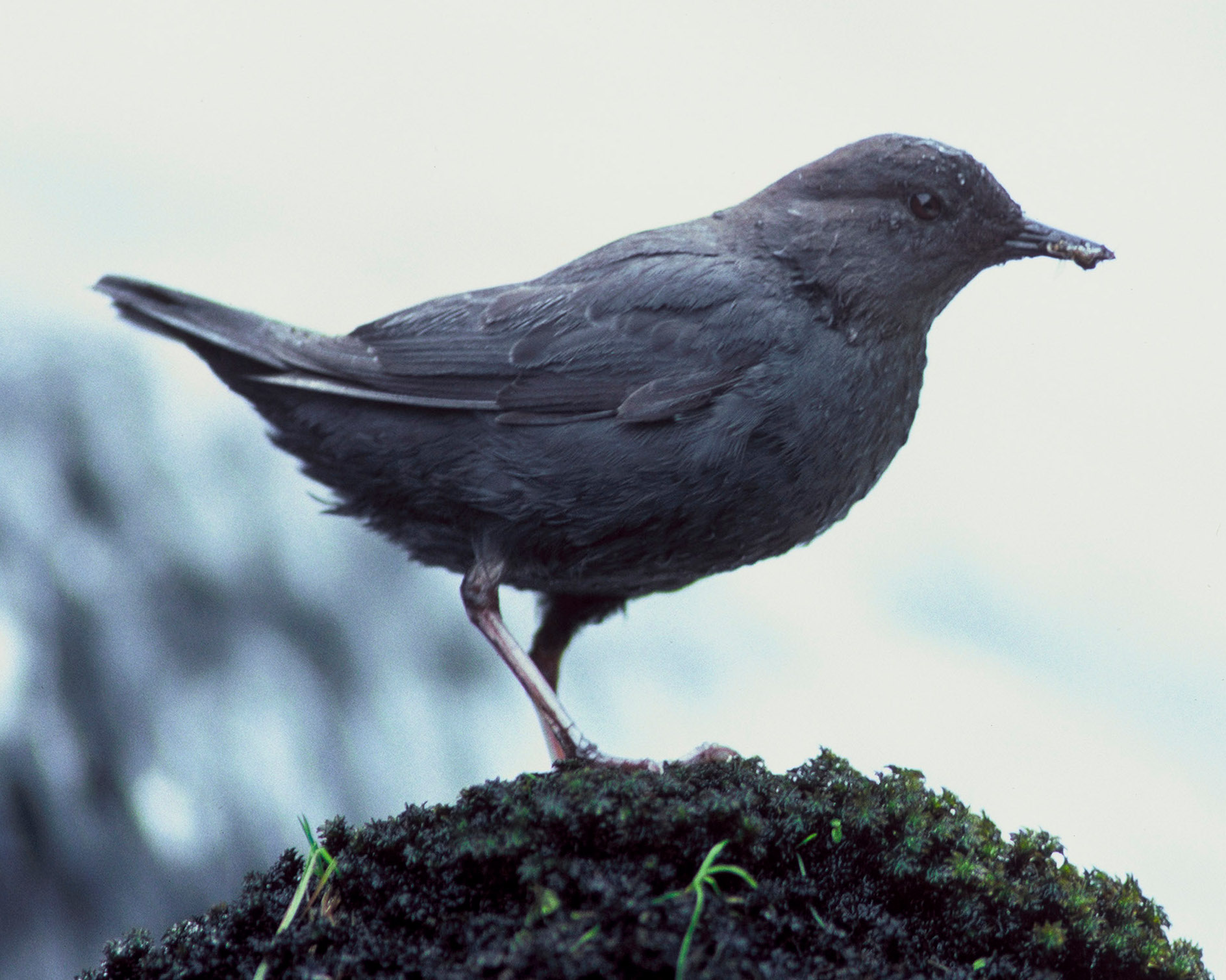
American dipper

- Red-throated pipit, Anthus cervinus
- Yellow wagtail, Motacilla flava
- Bluethroat, Luscinia svecica
- Eastern bluebird, Sialia sialis
- Mountain bluebird, Sialia currucoides
- Wood thrush, Hylocichla mustelina
- Gray catbird, Dumetella carolinensis
- Brown thrasher, Toxostoma rufum
- European starling, Sturnus vulgaris
- Golden-winged warbler, Vermivora chrysoptera
- Northern parula, Setophaga americana
- Townsend's warbler, Setophaga townsendi
- Pine warbler, Setophaga pinus
- Prairie warbler, Setophaga discolor
- MacGillivray's warbler, Geothlypis tolmiei
- Scarlet tanager, Piranga olivacea
- Western tanager, Piranga ludoviciana
- Spotted towhee, Pipilo maculatus
- Eastern towhee, Pipilo erythrophthalmus
- Brewer's sparrow, Spizella breweri
- Lark sparrow, Chondestes grammacus
- Vesper sparrow Pooecetes gramineus
- Baird's sparrow, Ammodramus bairdii
- Grasshopper sparrow, Ammodramus savannarum
- Harris's sparrow, Zonotrichia querula
- Northern cardinal, Cardinalis cardinalis
- Indigo bunting, Passerina cyanea
- Bobolink, Dolichonyx oryzivorus
- Red-winged blackbird, Agelaius phoeniceus
- Eastern meadowlark, Sturnella magna
- Western meadowlark, Sturnella neglecta

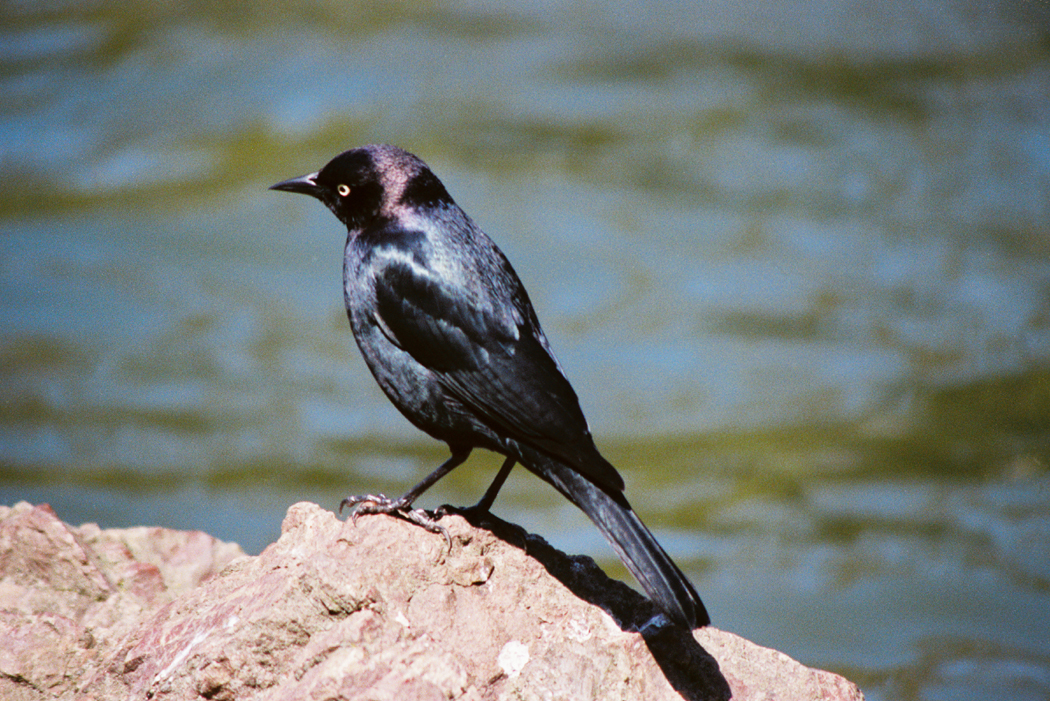
Brewer's blackbird

- Brewer's blackbird, Euphagus cyanocephalus
- Yellow-headed blackbird, Xanthocephalus xanthocephalus
- Brown-headed cowbird, Molothrus ater
- Baltimore oriole, Icterus galbula
- Cassin's finch, Carpodacus cassinii
- House finch, Carpodacus mexicanus
- American goldfinch, Spinus tristis
- House sparrow, Passer domesticus

== See also ==
- Taiga
- Boreal Forest Conservation Framework
- Success of fire suppression in northern forests
- List of North American birds
