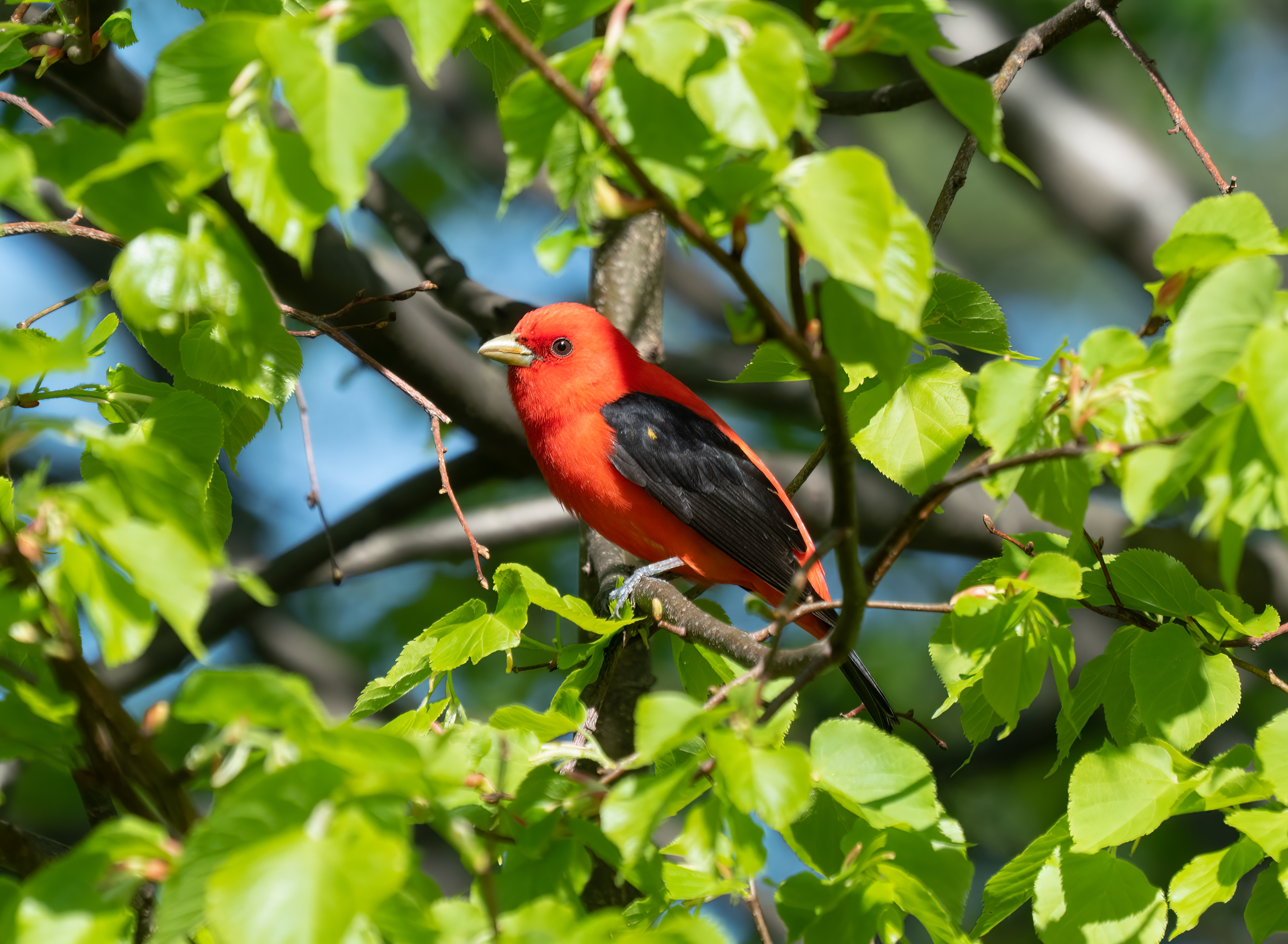
- Adult male
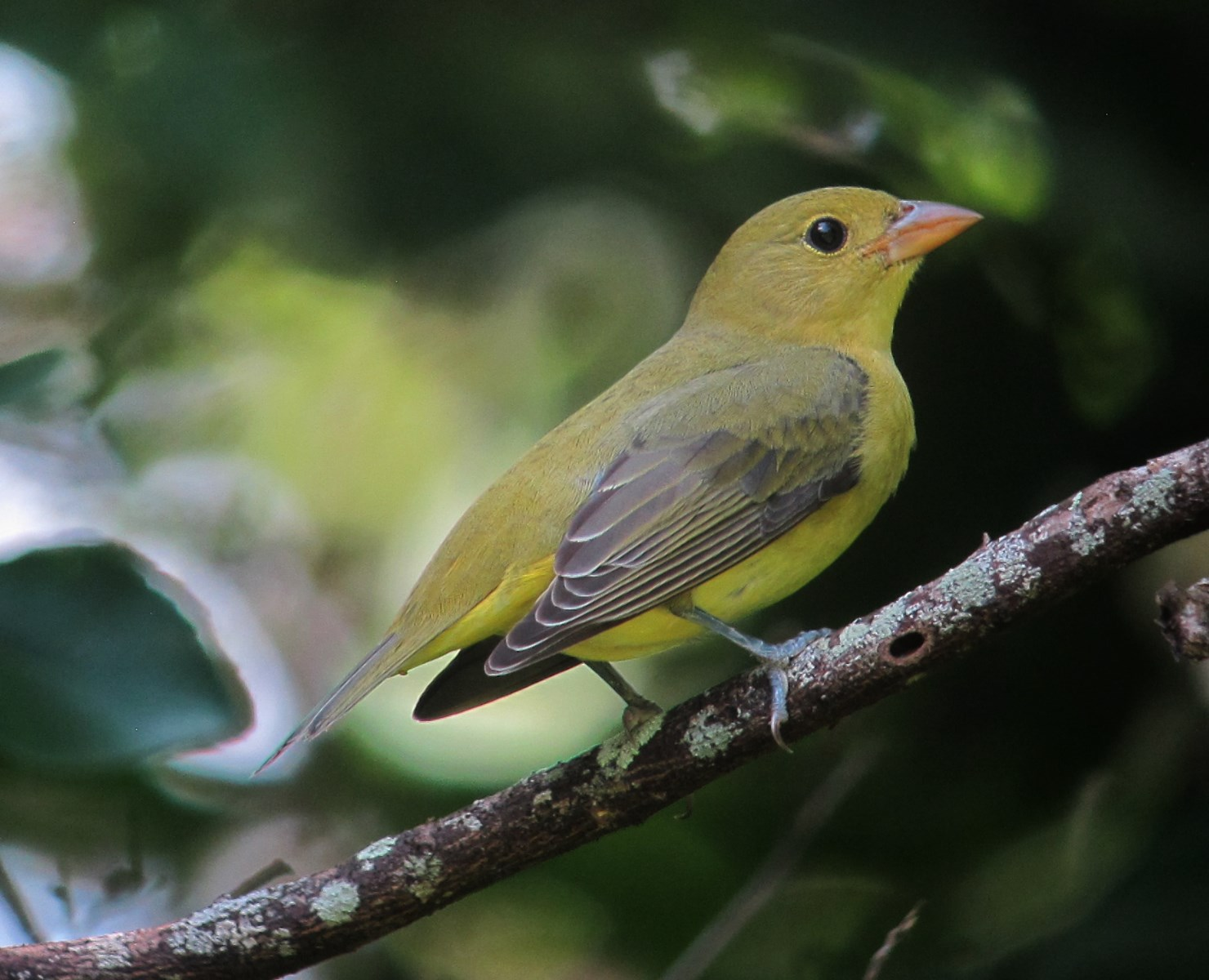
- Female

Conservation status
- Least Concern (IUCN 3.1)

Scientific classification
- Kingdom: Animalia
- Phylum: Chordata
- Class: Aves
- Order: Passeriformes
- Family: Cardinalidae
- Genus: Piranga
- Species: P. olivacea

Binomial name
- Piranga olivacea (Gmelin, 1789)
- Breeding Migration Nonbreeding Note: distribution on Hispaniola and Puerto Rico not shown

Synonyms
- Piranga erythromelas

= Scarlet tanager =

Species of bird

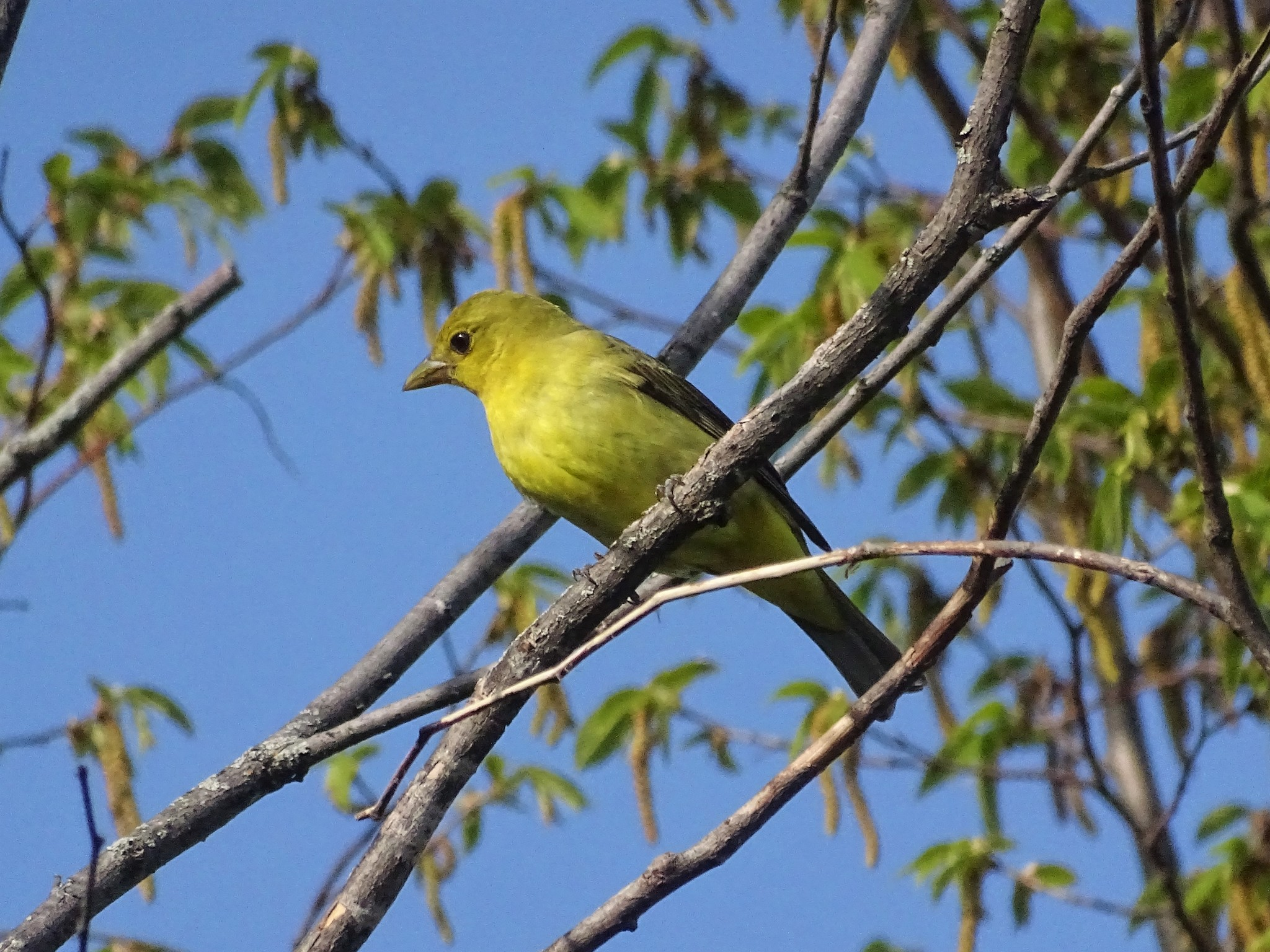
Adult female Scarlet Tanager, showcasing the yellow-olive plumage typical of the sex. Photographed in Ottawa, Ontario.

The scarlet tanager (Piranga olivacea) is a medium-sized American songbird in the cardinal family (Cardinalidae). It was placed in the tanager family (Thraupidae) until 2009, but was moved to Cardinalidae following several genetic studies indicating the Piranga tanagers are more closely related to cardinals and their allies. Breeding males have bright red plumage with black wings and tails, while females are yellow-olive. Outside the breeding season, males develop plumage similar to that of females, although their wings and tails remain darker. The species breeds mainly in large deciduous forests in eastern North America. It migrates through Central America to spend the winter in forests along the Andean foothills of northwestern South America. Scarlet tanagers feed mainly on insects, but they also eat fruit when it is available. Habitat fragmentation can increase nest predation and brood parasitism, and populations are declining in some areas. However, the species is classified as Least Concern by the International Union for Conservation of Nature.

== Etymology ==
The genus name Piranga is from Tupi Tijepiranga, the name for an unknown small bird, and the specific olivacea is from Neo-Latin olivaceus, "olive-green".

== Description ==
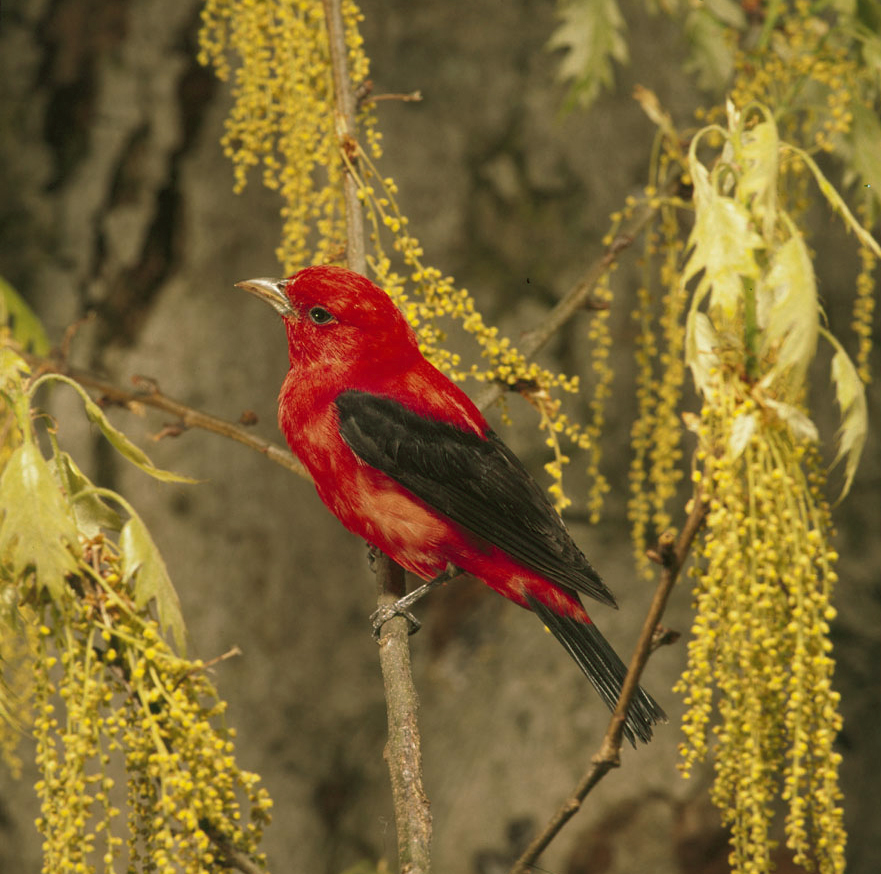
Male moulting to his duller feathers during autumn

The scarlet tanager, a mid-sized passerine, is marginally the smallest of the four species of Piranga that breed north of the Mexican border. It can weigh from 23.5 to 38 g (0.83 to 1.34 oz), with an average of 25 g (0.88 oz) during breeding and an average of 35 g (1.2 oz) at the beginning of migration. Scarlet tanagers can range in length from 16 to 19 cm (6.3 to 7.5 in) and from 25 to 30 cm (9.8 to 11.8 in) in wingspan. Adults of both sexes have pale, horn-colored, fairly stout, and smooth-textured bills. Adult males are crimson-red with black wings and tail. The male's coloration is intense and deeply red, similar but deeper in shade than the males of two occasionally co-existing relatives, the northern cardinal and the summer tanager, both which lack black wings. Females are yellowish on the underparts and olive on top, with yellow-olive-toned wings and tail. The adult male's winter plumage is similar to the female's, but the wings and tail remain darker. Young males briefly show a more complex, variegated plumage intermediate between adult males and females.

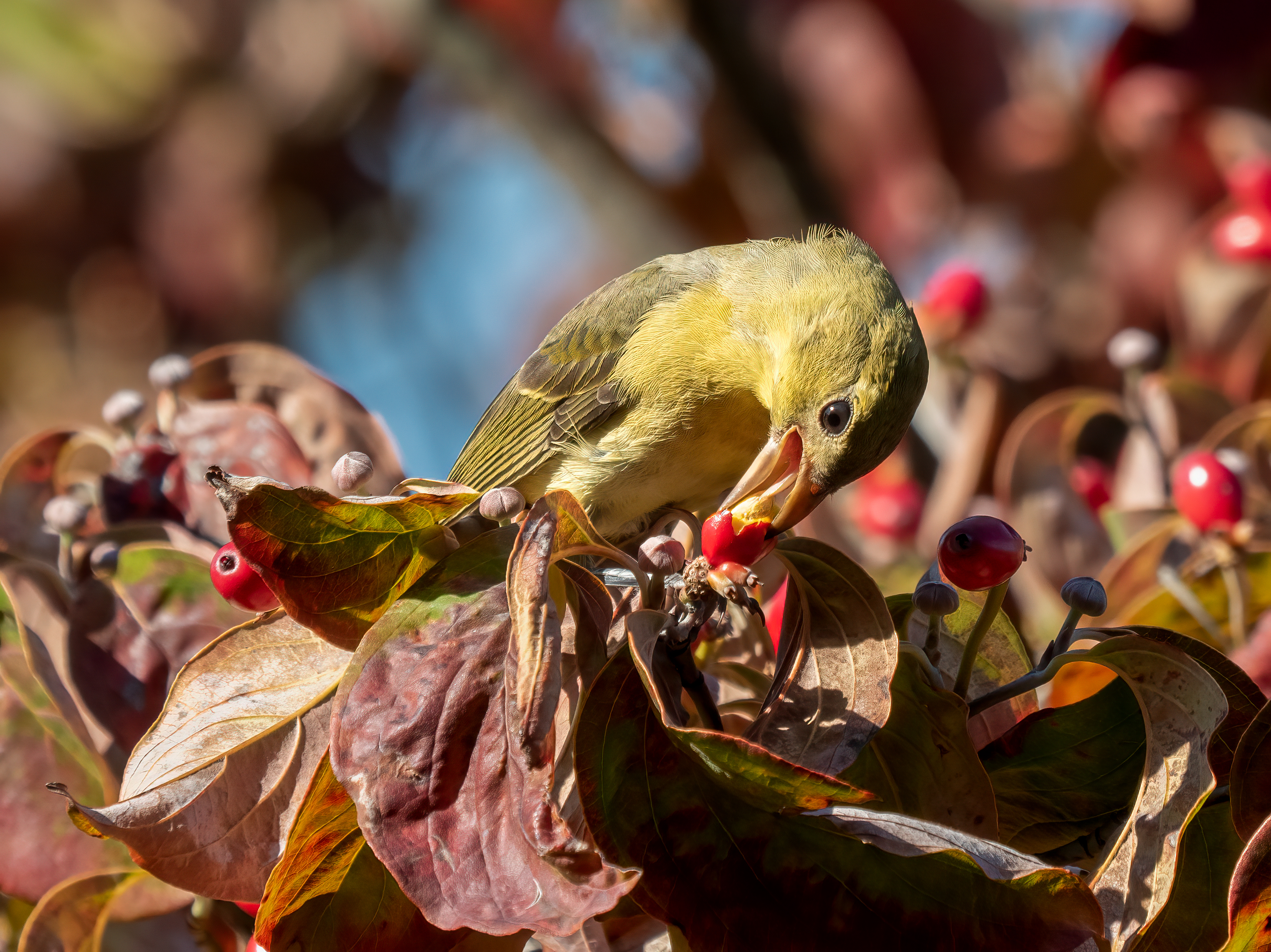
Female eating a flowering dogwood fruit in New York

The specific epithet olivacea ("olive-colored") describes the plumage of females and juveniles of the species. Some 19th century taxonomists used erythromelas (from Greek, red and black) to describe the species based on male specimens.

Female, immature, and nonbreeding males may be distinguished from the same ages and sexes in summer tanagers, which are more brownish overall, and western tanagers, which always have bold white bars and more yellowish undersides than scarlet tanagers. The song of the scarlet tanager sounds somewhat like a hoarser version of the American robin's and is only slightly dissimilar from the songs of the summer and western tanagers. The call of the scarlet tanager is an immediately distinctive chip-burr or chip-churr, which is very different from the pit-i-tuck of the summer tanager and the softer, rolled pri-tic or prit-i-tic of western tanager.

== Behavior ==
Their breeding habitat is large stretches of deciduous forest, especially with oaks, across eastern North America. They can occur, with varying degrees of success, in young successional woodlands and occasionally in extensive plantings of shade trees in suburban areas, parks, and cemeteries. For a viable breeding population, at least 10 to 12 hectares of forest are required. In winter, Scarlet tanagers migrate to the montane forest of the Andean foothills of northwestern South America, passing through Central America around April, and again around October. They begin arriving in their breeding grounds in numbers by about May and already start to move south again in midsummer; by early October, they are all on their way south. The bird is an extremely rare vagrant to Western Europe.

Call of the scarlet tanager

Scarlet tanagers are often out of sight, foraging high in trees, sometimes flying out to catch insects in flight and then returning to the same general perch, in a hunting style known as "sallying". Sometimes, however, they also capture their prey on the forest floor. They eat mainly insects, but opportunistically consume fruit when plentiful. Any flying variety of insect can readily be taken when common, such as bees, wasps, hornets, ants, and sawflies; moths and butterflies; beetles; flies; cicadas, leafhoppers, spittlebugs, treehoppers, plant lice, and scale insects; termites; grasshoppers and locusts; dragonflies; and dobsonflies. Scarlet tanagers also take snails, earthworms, and spiders. While summer tanagers are famous for this feeding method, when capturing bees, wasps, and hornets, scarlet tanagers also rake the prey against a branch to remove their stingers before consumption. Plant components of their diet include a wide variety of fruits that are eaten mainly when insect population are low: blackberries (Rubus allegheniensis), raspberries (R. ideaus), huckleberries (Gaylussacia sp.), juneberries and serviceberries (Amelanchier spp.), mulberries (Morus rubra), strawberries (Fragaria virginiana), and chokeberries (Aronia melanocarpa).

=== Breeding ===
Male scarlet tanagers reach their breeding ground from mid-May to early June. Females generally arrive several days to a week later. Nest building and egg laying both occur usually in less than two weeks after the adults arrive. The clutch is usually four eggs, occasionally from three to five and exceptionally from one to six eggs may be laid. The eggs are a light blue color, often with a slight greenish or whitish tinge. Incubation lasts for 11 to 14 days. Hatching and fledging are both reached at different points in summer depending on how far north the tanagers are breeding, from June-early July in the southern parts of its breeding range to as late as August or even early September in the northernmost part of its range. The average weight at hatching is 3.97 g (0.140 oz), with the nestlings increasing their weight to 20–22 g (0.71–0.78 oz) by 10 days, or 70% of the parent's weight. The young leave the nest by 9–12 days of age and fly capably by the time they are a few weeks old. If the nesting attempt is disturbed, scarlet tanagers apparently are unable to attempt a second brood, as several other passerines can. In a study of 16 nests in Michigan, 50% were successful in producing one or more fledglings. In western New York, fledgling success increased from 22% in scattered patches of woods to as high as 64% in extensive, undisturbed hardwood forest.

== Threats and status ==
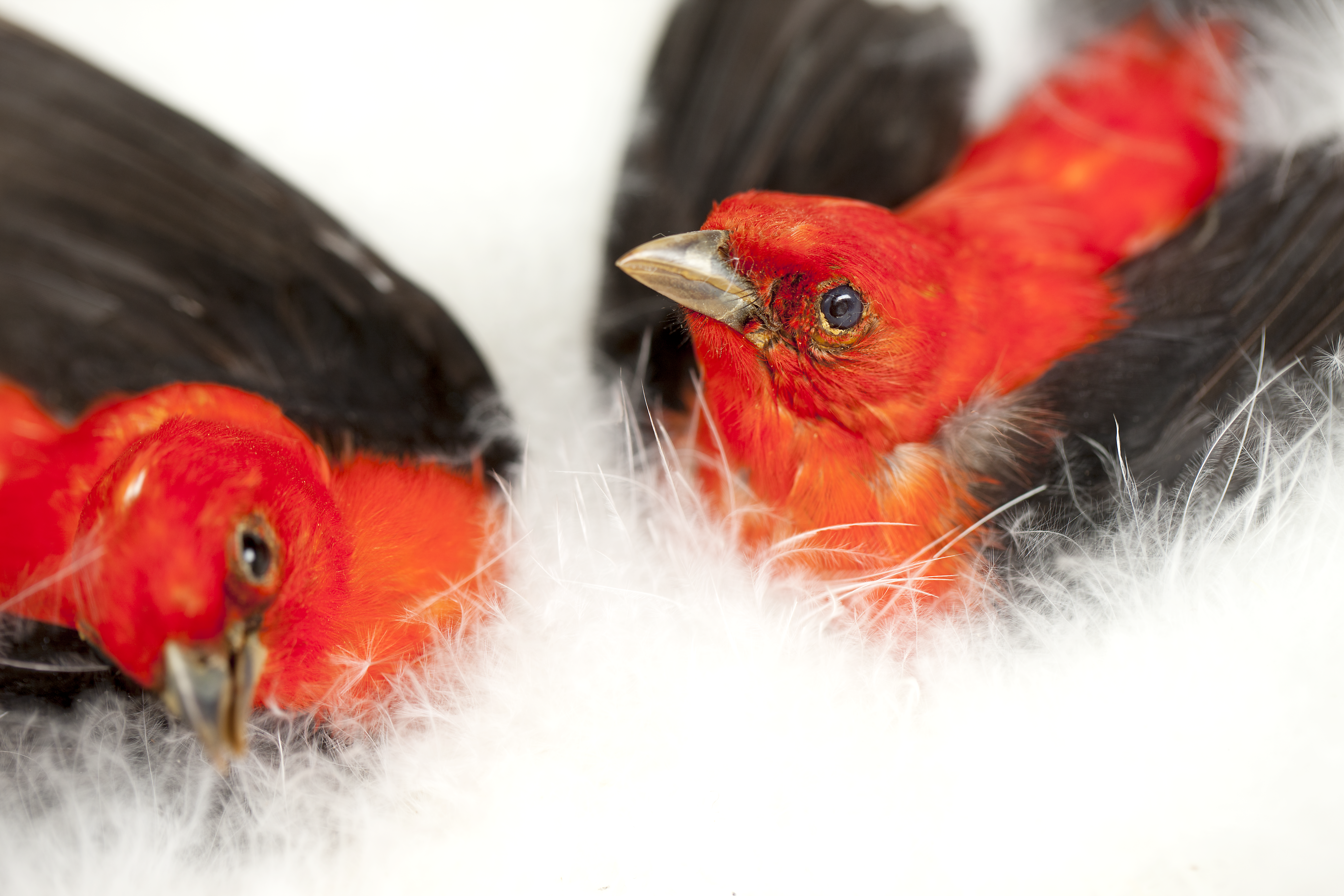
Stuffed scarlet tanager from 1860s, St. Barthélemy

In unusually cold weather, scarlet tanagers may succumb to exposure and starvation from a lack of insect prey. They often die from collisions with man-made objects including TV and radio towers, buildings and cars. Beyond failure due to brood parasitism of brown-headed cowbirds (Molothrus ater), predation is the primary direct cause of nesting failures. In one study, 69–78% of nests were preyed upon. Recorded nest predators are primarily avian like blue jays (Cyanocitta cristata), common grackles (Quiscalus quiscula) and American crows (Corvus brachyrhynchos), although others such as squirrels, chipmunks, raccoons (Procyon lotor), domestic cats (Felis catus), and snakes take a heavy toll. Raptorial birds hunt and kill many scarlet tanagers from fledgling throughout their adult lives, including all three North American Accipiter species, merlins (Falco columbarius), and owls, including eastern screech owls (Megascops asio), barred owls (Strix varia), long-eared owls (Asio otus), and short-eared owls (Asio flammeus).

Scarlet tanagers birds do best in the forest interior, where they are less exposed to predators and brood parasitism by the brown-headed cowbird. Being a bird that evolved to breed in forest interior and not exposed to the brown cowbird prior to habitat fragmentation, scarlet tanagers have not evolved any defensive strategies to cope with it. Where forest fragmentation occurs, which is quite widespread, the scarlet tanager suffers high rates of predation and brood parasitism in small forest plots and is often absent completely from plots less than a minimum size. Their nests are typically built on horizontal tree branches. As of 2025, the global population of scarlet tanagers is estimated to be 2.6 million mature individuals; this population is expected to be declining, but the IUCN classifies the scarlet tanager as being a species of least concern.
