= 1904 United States presidential election in South Dakota =

- November 8, 1904
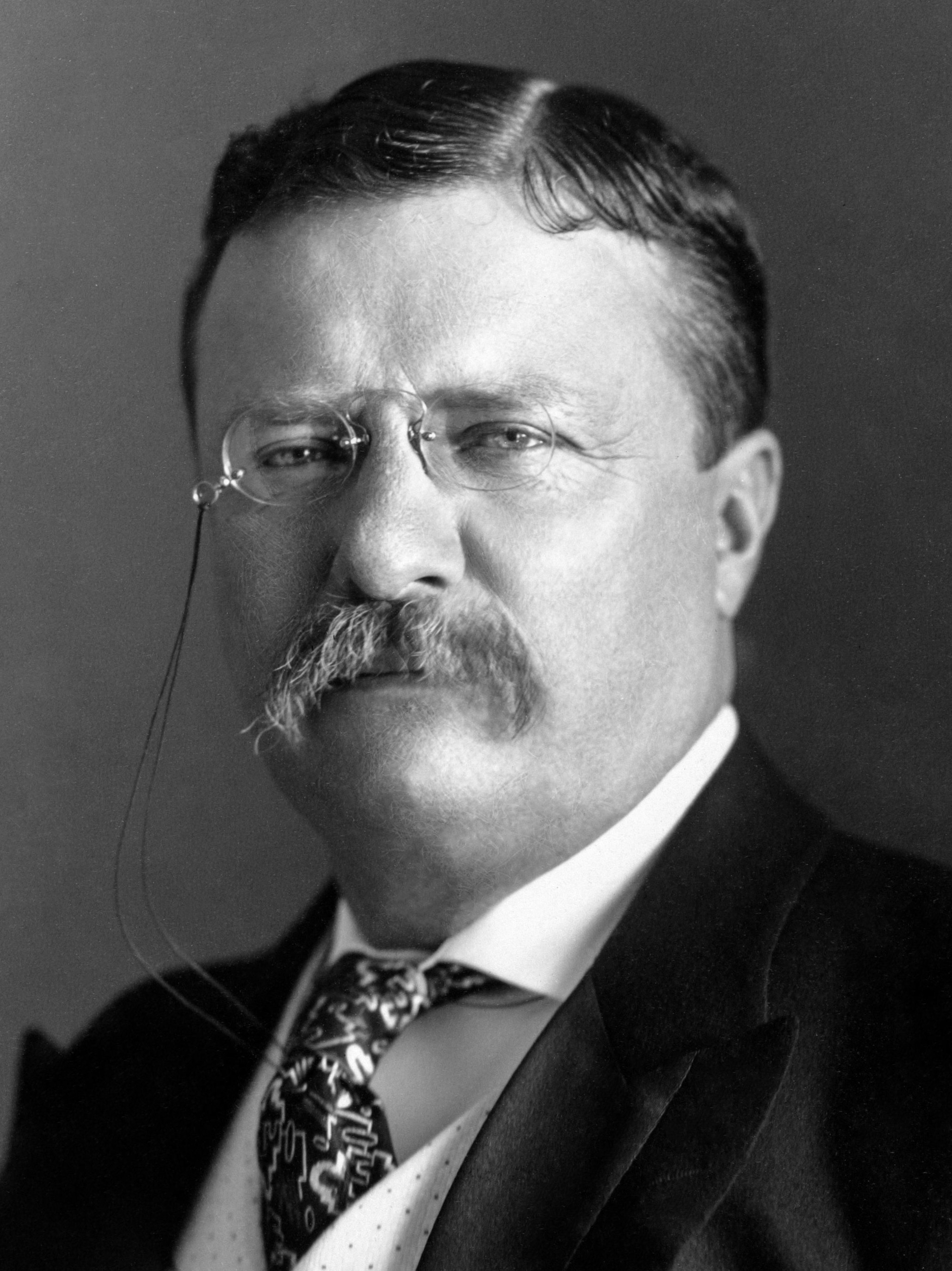

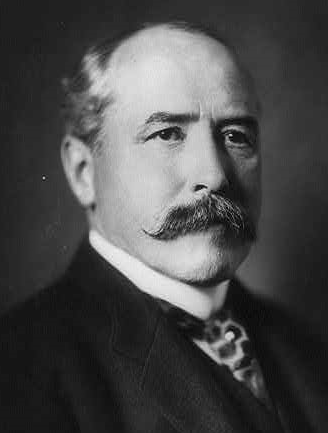
Nominee	Theodore Roosevelt	Alton B. Parker
Party	Republican	Democratic
Home state	New York	New York
Running mate	Charles W. Fairbanks	Henry G. Davis
Electoral vote	4	0
Popular vote	72,083	21,969
Percentage	71.09%	21.67%
County results
Roosevelt
50–60%
60–70%
70–80%
80–90%
President before election
Theodore Roosevelt
Republican
Elected President
Theodore Roosevelt
Republican

The 1904 United States presidential election in South Dakota took place on November 8, 1904. All contemporary 45 states were part of the 1904 United States presidential election. Voters chose four electors to the Electoral College, which selected the president and vice president.

South Dakota was won by the Republican nominees, incumbent President Theodore Roosevelt of New York and his running mate Charles W. Fairbanks of Indiana. They defeated the Democratic nominees, former Chief Judge of New York Court of Appeals Alton B. Parker and his running mate, former US Senator Henry G. Davis of West Virginia. Roosevelt won the state by a margin of 49.42%.

Roosevelt's win in South Dakota was the first time any presidential candidate swept every county in the state, which has only occurred once since, with Dwight D. Eisenhower's win in 1952.

With 71.09% of the popular vote, South Dakota would be Roosevelt's fourth strongest victory in terms of percentage in the popular vote after Vermont and South Dakota's neighboring states North Dakota and Minnesota. As of 2024, this is the best performance by any candidate in the state.

== Results ==
1904 United States presidential election in South Dakota
Party	Candidate	Votes	Percentage	Electoral votes
Republican	Theodore Roosevelt (incumbent)	72,083	71.09%	4
Democratic	Alton B. Parker	21,969	21.67%	0
Social Democratic	Eugene V. Debs	3,138	3.09%	0
Prohibition	Silas C. Swallow	2,965	2.92%	0
Populist	Thomas E. Watson	1,240	1.22%	0
Totals		101,395	100.00%	4
Voter turnout				—

=== Results by county ===
County	Theodore Roosevelt Republican		Alton B. Parker Democratic		Eugene V. Debs Socialist		Silas C. Swallow Prohibition		Thomas E. Watson People's		Margin		Total votes cast
County	#	%	#	%	#	%	#	%	#	%	#	%	Total votes cast
Aurora	652	58.79%	407	36.70%	11	0.99%	38	3.43%	1	0.09%	245	22.09%	1,109
Beadle	1,818	73.78%	493	20.01%	60	2.44%	57	2.31%	36	1.46%	1,325	53.77%	2,464
Bon Homme	1,547	62.30%	886	35.68%	18	0.72%	25	1.01%	7	0.28%	661	26.62%	2,483
Brookings	2,220	76.18%	353	12.11%	62	2.13%	252	8.65%	27	0.93%	1,867	64.07%	2,914
Brown	2,737	66.32%	988	23.94%	252	6.11%	130	3.15%	20	0.48%	1,749	42.38%	4,127
Brule	693	51.60%	608	45.27%	18	1.34%	5	0.37%	19	1.41%	85	6.33%	1,343
Buffalo	118	60.51%	43	22.05%	25	12.82%	0	0.00%	9	4.62%	75	38.46%	195
Butte	793	67.32%	330	28.01%	48	4.07%	1	0.08%	6	0.51%	463	39.30%	1,178
Campbell	685	83.03%	120	14.55%	2	0.24%	18	2.18%	0	0.00%	565	68.48%	825
Charles Mix	1,765	64.84%	823	30.24%	92	3.38%	30	1.10%	12	0.44%	942	34.61%	2,722
Clark	1,409	73.85%	276	14.47%	101	5.29%	102	5.35%	20	1.05%	1,133	59.38%	1,908
Clay	1,723	77.40%	361	16.22%	77	3.46%	39	1.75%	26	1.17%	1,362	61.19%	2,226
Codington	1,741	72.18%	582	24.13%	25	1.04%	55	2.28%	9	0.37%	1,159	48.05%	2,412
Custer	536	65.53%	228	27.87%	27	3.30%	2	0.24%	25	3.06%	308	37.65%	818
Davison	1,626	68.84%	506	21.42%	14	0.59%	106	4.49%	110	4.66%	1,120	47.42%	2,362
Day	2,077	73.50%	383	13.55%	63	2.23%	287	10.16%	16	0.57%	1,694	59.94%	2,826
Deuel	1,348	80.33%	279	16.63%	7	0.42%	36	2.15%	8	0.48%	1,069	63.71%	1,678
Douglas	859	61.89%	499	35.95%	9	0.65%	11	0.79%	10	0.72%	360	25.94%	1,388
Edmunds	786	65.88%	353	29.59%	16	1.34%	31	2.60%	7	0.59%	433	36.30%	1,193
Fall River	777	71.22%	248	22.73%	40	3.67%	21	1.92%	5	0.46%	529	48.49%	1,091
Faulk	727	75.41%	165	17.12%	11	1.14%	57	5.91%	4	0.41%	562	58.30%	964
Grant	1,454	77.05%	309	16.38%	20	1.06%	81	4.29%	23	1.22%	1,145	60.68%	1,887
Gregory	675	67.10%	282	28.03%	29	2.88%	9	0.89%	11	1.09%	393	39.07%	1,006
Hamlin	1,197	75.76%	307	19.43%	13	0.82%	56	3.54%	7	0.44%	890	56.33%	1,580
Hand	943	67.50%	170	12.17%	9	0.64%	37	2.65%	238	17.04%	705 (Note: In this county where Parker ran third behind Roosevelt and Watson, margin given is Roosevelt vote minus Watson vote and percentage margin Roosevelt percentage minus Watson percentage.)	50.47%	1,397
Hanson	745	55.76%	523	39.15%	9	0.67%	51	3.82%	8	0.60%	222	16.62%	1,336
Hughes	929	72.18%	335	26.03%	12	0.93%	9	0.70%	2	0.16%	594	46.15%	1,287
Hutchinson	1,752	80.33%	365	16.74%	6	0.28%	53	2.43%	5	0.23%	1,387	63.59%	2,181
Hyde	443	76.91%	91	15.80%	15	2.60%	25	4.34%	2	0.35%	352	61.11%	576
Jerauld	586	68.86%	139	16.33%	25	2.94%	67	7.87%	34	4.00%	447	52.53%	851
Kingsbury	1,896	77.67%	344	14.09%	56	2.29%	112	4.59%	33	1.35%	1,552	63.58%	2,441
Lake	1,728	78.90%	260	11.87%	94	4.29%	69	3.15%	39	1.78%	1,468	67.03%	2,190
Lawrence	4,247	65.53%	1,347	20.78%	818	12.62%	32	0.49%	37	0.57%	2,900	44.75%	6,481
Lincoln	2,471	80.49%	378	12.31%	132	4.30%	69	2.25%	20	0.65%	2,093	68.18%	3,070
Lyman	986	73.53%	306	22.82%	21	1.57%	13	0.97%	15	1.12%	680	50.71%	1,341
Marshall	996	67.94%	292	19.92%	61	4.16%	107	7.30%	10	0.68%	704	48.02%	1,466
McCook	1,284	61.58%	693	33.24%	50	2.40%	50	2.40%	8	0.38%	591	28.35%	2,085
McPherson	727	81.96%	144	16.23%	5	0.56%	6	0.68%	5	0.56%	583	65.73%	887
Meade	754	65.79%	268	23.39%	49	4.28%	15	1.31%	60	5.24%	486	42.41%	1,146
Miner	893	61.29%	475	32.60%	40	2.75%	40	2.75%	9	0.62%	418	28.69%	1,457
Minnehaha	4,455	74.04%	1,046	17.38%	269	4.47%	190	3.16%	57	0.95%	3,409	56.66%	6,017
Moody	1,471	75.13%	295	15.07%	39	1.99%	66	3.37%	87	4.44%	1,176	60.06%	1,958
Pennington	1,126	69.00%	392	24.02%	75	4.60%	11	0.67%	28	1.72%	734	44.98%	1,632
Potter	525	62.80%	275	32.89%	18	2.15%	10	1.20%	8	0.96%	250	29.90%	836
Roberts	2,282	75.02%	584	19.20%	61	2.01%	99	3.25%	16	0.53%	1,698	55.82%	3,042
Sanborn	1,013	74.05%	265	19.37%	15	1.10%	64	4.68%	11	0.80%	748	54.68%	1,368
Spink	2,127	74.53%	492	17.24%	68	2.38%	140	4.91%	27	0.95%	1,635	57.29%	2,854
Stanley	547	56.74%	396	41.08%	11	1.14%	10	1.04%	0	0.00%	151	15.66%	964
Sully	364	82.92%	50	11.39%	15	3.42%	5	1.14%	5	1.14%	314	71.53%	439
Turner	2,395	79.07%	521	17.20%	23	0.76%	76	2.51%	14	0.46%	1,874	61.87%	3,029
Union	1,813	68.31%	730	27.51%	39	1.47%	49	1.85%	23	0.87%	1,083	40.81%	2,654
Walworth	654	76.05%	176	20.47%	17	1.98%	9	1.05%	4	0.47%	478	55.58%	860
Yankton	1,968	69.03%	788	27.64%	46	1.61%	32	1.12%	17	0.60%	1,180	41.39%	2,851
Totals	72,083	71.09%	21,969	21.67%	3,138	3.09%	2,965	2.92%	1,240	1.22%	50,114	49.42%	101,395

== See also ==
- United States presidential elections in South Dakota
