= 1868 United States presidential election in Vermont =

- November 3, 1868
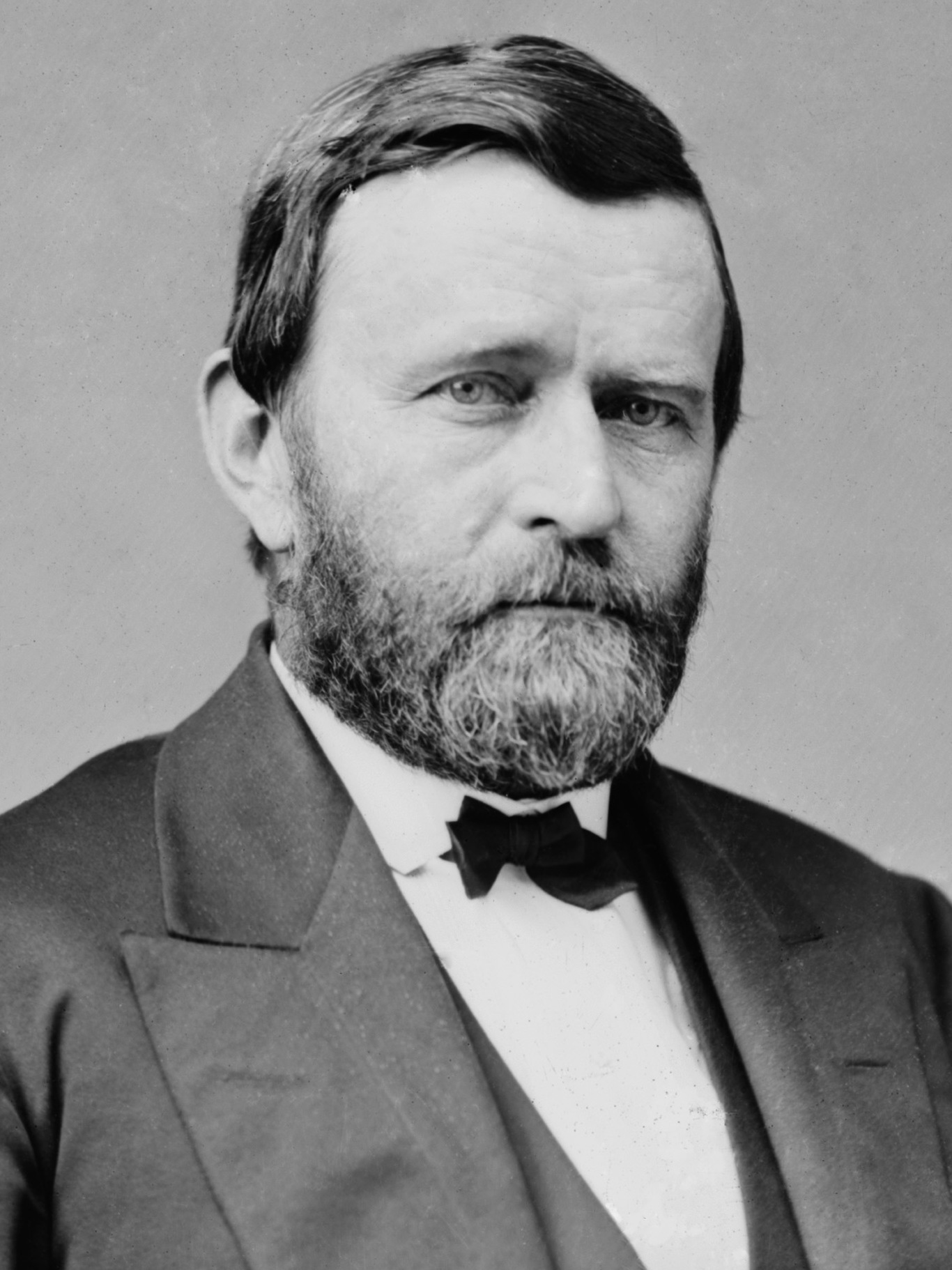

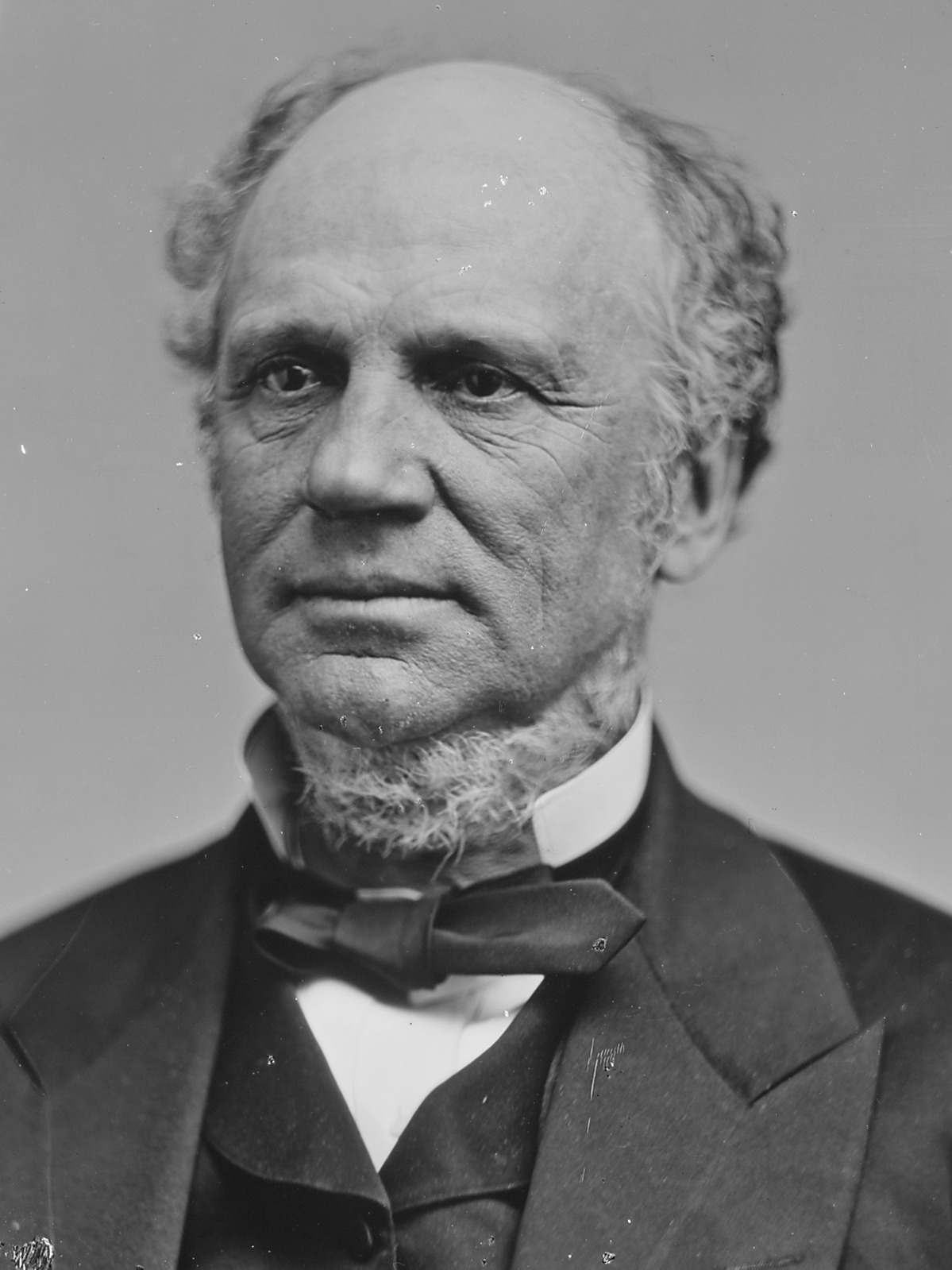
Nominee	Ulysses S. Grant	Horatio Seymour
Party	Republican	Democratic
Home state	Illinois	New York
Running mate	Schuyler Colfax	Francis Preston Blair Jr.
Electoral vote	5	0
Popular vote	44,167	12,045
Percentage	78.57%	21.43%

Grant
50–60%
60–70%
70–80%
80–90%
90–100%
Seymour
50–60%
Tie
50%
President before election
Andrew Johnson
Democratic
Elected President
Ulysses S. Grant
Republican

The 1868 United States presidential election in Vermont took place on November 3, 1868, as part of the 1868 United States presidential election. Voters chose five representatives, or electors to the Electoral College, who voted for president and vice president.

Vermont voted for the Republican nominee, Ulysses S. Grant, over the Democratic nominee, Horatio Seymour. Grant won the state by a margin of 57.14%.

With 78.57% of the popular vote, Vermont would be Grant's strongest victory in terms of percentage in the popular vote. In addition, Grant's performance in Vermont in popular vote percentage was the second-best for a Republican presidential candidate only after William McKinley's 80.08% in 1896. Grant's performance in Addison County is also the last time that a Republican, or any candidate, has received over 90% in a Vermont county, and one of only two occasions (along with Abraham Lincoln's performance in Addison four years earlier) that a candidate has done so despite the state's overwhelming Republican dominance for nearly a century.

== Results ==
1868 United States presidential election in Vermont
Party	Candidate	Running mate	Popular vote		Electoral vote	
Party	Candidate	Running mate	Count	%	Count	%
Republican	Ulysses S. Grant of Illinois	Schuyler Colfax of Indiana	44,167	78.57%	5	100.00%
Democratic	Horatio Seymour of New York	Francis Preston Blair Jr. of Missouri	12,045	21.43%	0	0.00%
Total			56,212	100.00%	5	100.00%

== See also ==
- United States presidential elections in Vermont
