= 1976 United States presidential election in Vermont =

- November 2, 1976

Nominee	Gerald Ford	Jimmy Carter
Party	Republican	Democratic
Alliance		Independent Vermonters (Note: Carter was a fusion ticket of the Democrats and Independent Vermonters.)
Home state	Michigan	Georgia
Running mate	Bob Dole	Walter Mondale
Electoral vote	3	0
Popular vote	102,085	81,044
Percentage	54.34%	43.14%

Ford
40–50%
50–60%
60–70%
70–80%
90–100%
Carter
40–50%
50–60%
60–70%
President before election
Gerald Ford
Republican
Elected President
Jimmy Carter
Democratic

The 1976 United States presidential election in Vermont took place on November 2, 1976, as part of the 1976 United States presidential election which was held throughout all 50 states and the District of Columbia. Voters chose three representatives, or electors to the Electoral College, who voted for president and vice president.

Vermont voted for incumbent Republican President Gerald Ford of Michigan and his running mate Senator Bob Dole of Kansas, defeating Democratic Governor Jimmy Carter of Georgia and his running mate Senator Walter Mondale of Minnesota. Vermont was the only state in the nation in 1976 in which every county or county-equivalent voted for Ford, despite Vermont only being Ford's 8th strongest state in the nation in terms of percentage of the vote.

Ford took 54.34% of the vote to Carter's 43.14%, a victory margin of 11.20%. Anti-war former Democratic Senator Eugene McCarthy of Minnesota, running as an independent presidential candidate, came in a distant third, with 2.13%.

== Primaries ==
Presidential primaries were held in the state on March 2, 1976, for the Democratic, Republican and Liberty Union parties.

=== Democratic primary ===
Jimmy Carter won the state's non-binding primary against three other candidates. Delegates were later pledged at the party's state convention on May 22.

Results of the 1976 Vermont Democratic presidential primary
Candidate	Vote	
Candidate	#	%
Jimmy Carter	16,335	46.34%
Sargent Shriver	10,699	30.35%
Fred R. Harris	4,893	13.88%
Ellen McCormack	3,324	9.43%
Total valid votes	35,251	100%

=== Republican primary ===
Gerald Ford won the primary by a large margin and earned a majority of the state's delegates.

Results of the 1976 Vermont Republican presidential primary
Candidate	Vote		Pledged delegates
Candidate	#	%	Pledged delegates
Gerald Ford (incumbent)	27,014	84.67%	17
Ronald Reagan	4,892	15.33%	3
Total valid votes	31,906	100%	20

=== Liberty Union primary ===
Results of the 1976 Liberty Union presidential primary
Candidate	Vote	
Candidate	#	%
Margaret Wright	965	100%
Total valid votes	965	100%

== Results ==
1976 United States presidential election in Vermont
Party	Candidate	Votes	Percentage	Electoral votes
Republican	Gerald Ford (incumbent)	102,085	54.34%	3
Democratic/Independent Vermonters	Jimmy Carter	81,044	43.14%	0
McCarthy '76	Eugene McCarthy	4,001	2.13%	0
Socialist Workers	Peter Camejo	430	0.23%	0
U.S. Labor	Lyndon LaRouche	196	0.10%	0
No party	Write-ins	99	0.05%	0
Totals		187,855	100.00%	3
Voter Turnout (Voting age/Registered)				56%/66%

=== Results by county ===
County	Gerald Ford Republican		Jimmy Carter Democratic		Eugene McCarthy “McCarthy ‘76”		Peter Camejo Socialist Workers		Various candidates Other parties		Margin		Total votes cast
County	#	%	#	%	#	%	#	%	#	%	#	%	Total votes cast
Addison	5,726	56.52%	4,164	41.10%	195	1.92%	33	0.33%	13	0.13%	1,562	15.42%	10,131
Bennington	6,712	54.19%	5,443	43.94%	195	1.57%	16	0.13%	21	0.17%	1,269	10.25%	12,387
Caledonia	5,488	59.63%	3,511	38.15%	171	1.86%	15	0.16%	18	0.20%	1,977	21.48%	9,203
Chittenden	22,013	53.23%	17,992	43.51%	1,154	2.79%	144	0.35%	53	0.13%	4,021	9.72%	41,356
Essex	1,161	53.04%	1,002	45.77%	19	0.87%	4	0.18%	3	0.14%	159	7.27%	2,189
Franklin	6,190	51.64%	5,610	46.80%	150	1.25%	17	0.14%	19	0.16%	580	4.84%	11,986
Grand Isle	1,004	52.59%	866	45.36%	34	1.78%	3	0.16%	2	0.10%	138	7.23%	1,909
Lamoille	3,535	61.56%	2,016	35.11%	173	3.01%	9	0.16%	9	0.16%	1,519	26.45%	5,742
Orange	4,768	58.61%	3,171	38.98%	168	2.07%	19	0.23%	9	0.11%	1,597	19.63%	8,135
Orleans	4,075	52.30%	3,561	45.71%	124	1.59%	7	0.09%	24	0.31%	514	6.59%	7,791
Rutland	11,565	53.00%	9,868	45.23%	324	1.48%	28	0.13%	34	0.16%	1,697	7.77%	21,819
Washington	10,919	53.90%	8,764	43.26%	460	2.27%	80	0.39%	36	0.18%	2,155	10.64%	20,259
Windham	7,928	52.05%	6,794	44.60%	456	2.99%	36	0.24%	18	0.12%	1,134	7.45%	15,232
Windsor	11,001	55.80%	8,282	42.01%	378	1.92%	19	0.10%	36	0.18%	2,719	13.79%	19,716
Totals	102,085	54.34%	81,044	43.14%	4,001	2.13%	430	0.23%	295	0.16%	21,041	11.20%	187,855

== Analysis ==
Vermont historically was a bastion of liberal Northeastern Republicanism, and by 1976 it had gone Republican in every presidential election since the founding of the Republican Party, except in the Democratic landslide of 1964, when the GOP had nominated staunch conservative Barry Goldwater. Gerald Ford, a moderate Northern Republican from Michigan, was easily able to continue the Republican tradition in Vermont, carrying the state comfortably and sweeping every county in the state against Southerner Jimmy Carter. This was the first election since 1892 when Grand Isle County had backed a losing candidate. In addition, this was also the most recent presidential election until 2020 when sparsely populated Essex County did not vote for/back the overall winning candidate.

As the Republican Party would lurch to the right with Ronald Reagan four years later in 1980, Vermont would prove to be the only state in the nation where the moderate Ford would outperform the conservative Reagan. Ford won the state by a larger margin and won more counties than Reagan, reflecting the process of realignment going on at the time both within the party and within the state.

1976 was the last time that a losing Republican candidate would carry the state of Vermont, and the last time that the state would vote Republican in a close election. It was also the last election in which Vermont was more Republican than the nation as a whole, with Ford winning the state by over 11 points despite losing the national race by 2, making Vermont 13% more Republican than the national average in the 1976 election. Vermont would vote more Democratic than the nation in every election that has followed beginning in 1980.

== See also ==
- United States presidential elections in Vermont
