= 1812 United States presidential election in Vermont =

- October 30, 1812 – December 2, 1812
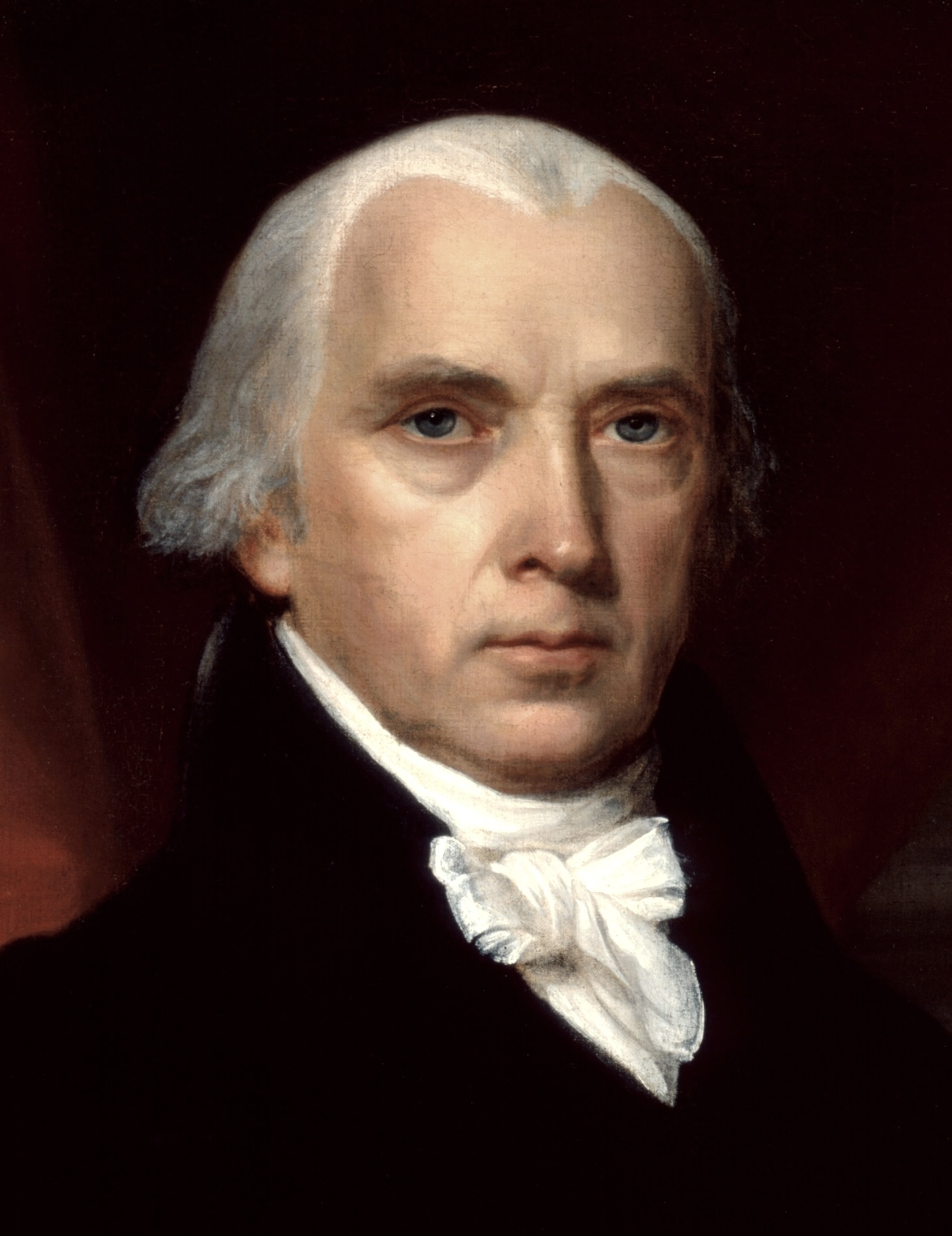
Nominee	James Madison
Party	Democratic-Republican
Home state	Virginia
Running mate	Elbridge Gerry
Electoral vote	8
Percentage	100%
President before election
James Madison
Democratic-Republican
Elected President
James Madison
Democratic-Republican

The 1812 United States presidential election in Vermont took place between October 30 and December 2, 1812, as part of the 1812 United States presidential election. The state legislature chose eight representatives, or electors to the Electoral College, who voted for President and Vice President.

During this election, Vermont cast its eight electoral votes to Democratic Republican candidate and incumbent President James Madison. For the second time in the state's history, Vermont became the only state in New England to vote for Madison, as the other four New England states cast their electoral votes for the other Democratic-Republican and Federalist supported candidate DeWitt Clinton.

== See also ==
- United States presidential elections in Vermont
