= 1904 United States presidential election in North Dakota =

- November 8, 1904
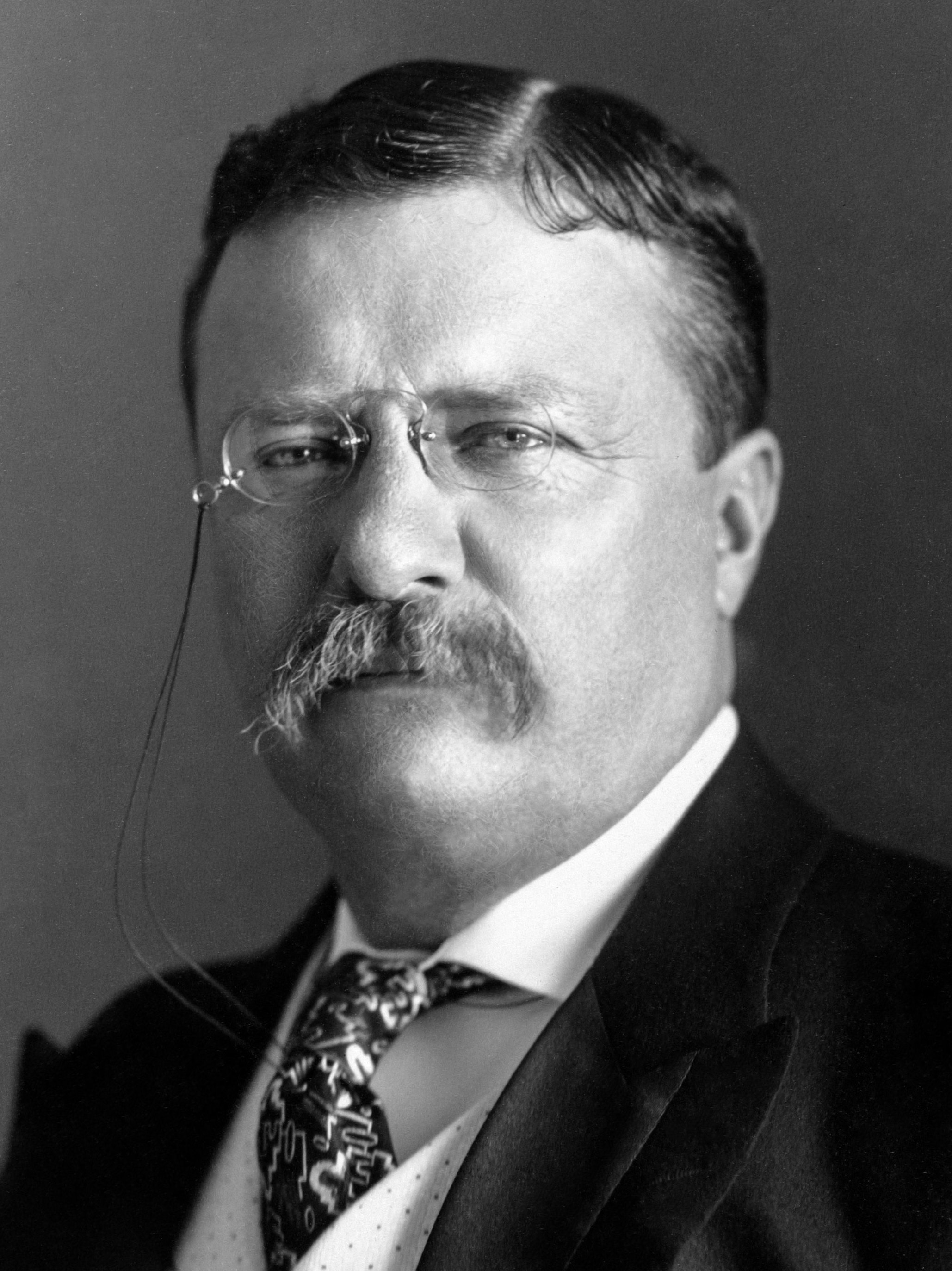

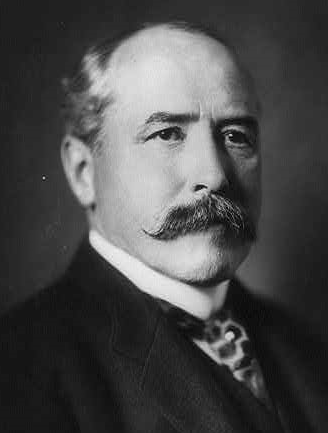
Nominee	Theodore Roosevelt	Alton B. Parker
Party	Republican	Democratic
Home state	New York	New York
Running mate	Charles W. Fairbanks	Henry G. Davis
Electoral vote	4	0
Popular vote	52,595	14,273
Percentage	75.12%	20.39%
County results
Roosevelt
60–70%
70–80%
80–90%
90–100%
President before election
Theodore Roosevelt
Republican
Elected President
Theodore Roosevelt
Republican

The 1904 United States presidential election in North Dakota took place on November 8, 1904. All contemporary 45 states were part of the 1904 United States presidential election. Voters chose four electors to the Electoral College, which selected the president and vice president.

North Dakota was won by the Republican nominees, incumbent President Theodore Roosevelt of New York and his running mate Charles W. Fairbanks of Indiana. They defeated the Democratic nominees, former Chief Judge of New York Court of Appeals Alton B. Parker and his running mate, former US Senator Henry G. Davis of West Virginia. Roosevelt won the state by a margin of 54.73% points.

With 75.12% of the popular vote, North Dakota was Roosevelt's second strongest victory in terms of percentage in the popular vote after Vermont.

== Results ==
1904 United States presidential election in North Dakota
Party	Candidate	Votes	Percentage	Electoral votes
Republican	Theodore Roosevelt (incumbent)	52,595	75.12%	4
Democratic	Alton B. Parker	14,273	20.39%	0
Social Democratic	Eugene V. Debs	2,009	2.87%	0
Prohibition	Silas C. Swallow	1,137	1.62%	0
Totals		70,014	100.00%	4
Voter turnout				—

=== Results by county ===
County	Theodore Roosevelt Republican		Alton B. Parker Democratic		Eugene V. Debs Social Democratic		Silas C. Swallow Prohibition		Margin		Total votes cast
County	#	%	#	%	#	%	#	%	#	%	Total votes cast
Barnes	2,041	76.13%	451	16.82%	117	4.36%	72	2.69%	1,590	59.31%	2,681
Benson	1,111	85.59%	143	11.02%	7	0.54%	37	2.85%	968	74.58%	1,298
Billings	256	85.05%	37	12.29%	5	1.66%	3	1.00%	219	72.76%	301
Bottineau	2,094	68.48%	753	24.62%	166	5.43%	45	1.47%	1,341	43.85%	3,058
Burleigh	1,340	83.23%	237	14.72%	24	1.49%	9	0.56%	1,103	68.51%	1,610
Cass	3,788	80.41%	609	12.93%	159	3.38%	155	3.29%	3,179	67.48%	4,711
Cavalier	1,664	66.77%	771	30.94%	48	1.93%	9	0.36%	893	35.83%	2,492
Dickey	998	69.64%	336	23.45%	75	5.23%	24	1.67%	662	46.20%	1,433
Eddy	596	76.21%	162	20.72%	13	1.66%	11	1.41%	434	55.50%	782
Emmons	653	68.66%	281	29.55%	11	1.16%	6	0.63%	372	39.12%	951
Foster	618	71.69%	223	25.87%	12	1.39%	9	1.04%	395	45.82%	862
Grand Forks	2,807	73.16%	828	21.58%	143	3.73%	59	1.54%	1,979	51.58%	3,837
Griggs	688	66.80%	232	22.52%	33	3.20%	77	7.48%	456	44.27%	1,030
Kidder	447	87.13%	53	10.33%	6	1.17%	7	1.36%	394	76.80%	513
LaMoure	860	77.13%	195	17.49%	45	4.04%	15	1.35%	665	59.64%	1,115
Logan	454	92.84%	31	6.34%	4	0.82%	0	0.00%	423	86.50%	489
McHenry	1,807	73.54%	556	22.63%	66	2.69%	28	1.14%	1,251	50.92%	2,457
McIntosh	736	92.46%	58	7.29%	2	0.25%	0	0.00%	678	85.18%	796
McLean	1,928	88.44%	219	10.05%	17	0.78%	16	0.73%	1,709	78.39%	2,180
Mercer	252	93.33%	17	6.30%	0	0.00%	1	0.37%	235	87.04%	270
Morton	1,474	80.77%	321	17.59%	25	1.37%	5	0.27%	1,153	63.18%	1,825
Nelson	1,284	74.61%	340	19.76%	71	4.13%	26	1.51%	944	54.85%	1,721
Oliver	241	81.42%	46	15.54%	3	1.01%	6	2.03%	195	65.88%	296
Pembina	1,870	70.01%	743	27.82%	5	0.19%	53	1.98%	1,127	42.19%	2,671
Pierce	921	73.39%	284	22.63%	34	2.71%	16	1.27%	637	50.76%	1,255
Ramsey	1,523	76.46%	386	19.38%	64	3.21%	19	0.95%	1,137	57.08%	1,992
Ransom	1,257	79.66%	253	16.03%	29	1.84%	39	2.47%	1,004	63.62%	1,578
Richland	2,420	66.50%	1,116	30.67%	63	1.73%	40	1.10%	1,304	35.83%	3,639
Rolette	912	66.38%	366	26.64%	81	5.90%	15	1.09%	546	39.74%	1,374
Sargent	1,045	71.62%	310	21.25%	91	6.24%	13	0.89%	735	50.38%	1,459
Stark	703	73.92%	231	24.29%	16	1.68%	1	0.11%	472	49.63%	951
Steele	817	86.82%	69	7.33%	30	3.19%	25	2.66%	748	79.49%	941
Stutsman	1,856	78.25%	453	19.10%	28	1.18%	35	1.48%	1,403	59.15%	2,372
Towner	1,022	67.24%	435	28.62%	54	3.55%	9	0.59%	587	38.62%	1,520
Traill	1,566	82.99%	176	9.33%	61	3.23%	84	4.45%	1,390	73.66%	1,887
Walsh	2,042	61.97%	1,113	33.78%	103	3.13%	37	1.12%	929	28.19%	3,295
Ward	4,349	78.15%	914	16.42%	224	4.03%	78	1.40%	3,435	61.73%	5,565
Wells	1,330	80.90%	209	12.71%	64	3.89%	41	2.49%	1,121	68.19%	1,644
Williams	825	70.94%	316	27.17%	10	0.86%	12	1.03%	509	43.77%	1,163
Totals	52,595	75.12%	14,273	20.39%	2,009	2.87%	1,137	1.62%	38,322	54.73%	70,014

== See also ==
- United States presidential elections in North Dakota
