= 1876 United States presidential election in Vermont =

- November 7, 1876
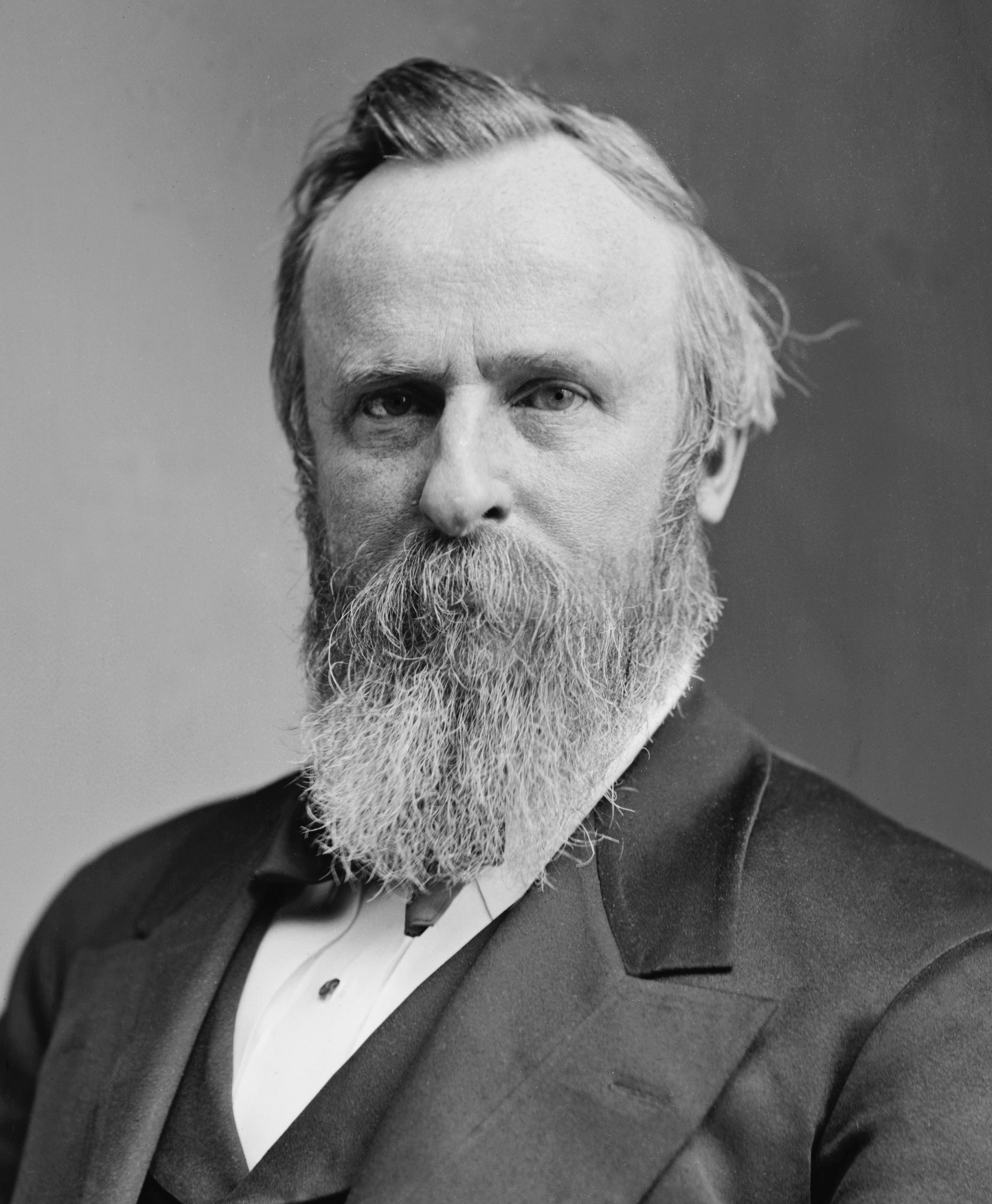

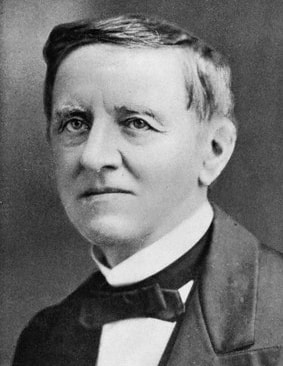
Nominee	Rutherford B. Hayes	Samuel J. Tilden
Party	Republican	Democratic
Home state	Ohio	New York
Running mate	William A. Wheeler	Thomas A. Hendricks
Electoral vote	5	0
Popular vote	44,091	20,254
Percentage	68.30%	31.38%

Hayes
50–60%
60–70%
70–80%
80–90%
90–100%
Tilden
50–60%
60–70%
Tie
50%
President before election
Ulysses S. Grant
Republican
Elected President
Rutherford B. Hayes
Republican

The 1876 United States presidential election in Vermont took place on November 7, 1876, as part of the 1876 United States presidential election. Voters chose five representatives, or electors to the Electoral College, who voted for president and vice president.

Vermont voted for the Republican nominee, Rutherford B. Hayes, over the Democratic nominee, Samuel J. Tilden. Hayes won Vermont by a margin of 36.92%.

With 68.30% of the popular vote, Vermont would be Hayes' strongest victory in terms of percentage in the popular vote.

== Campaign ==
Russell S. Taft was the chair of the Republican state convention held in Burlington, Vermont, on March 23, 1876. The delegates to the Republican National Convention were Luke P. Poland, G. Veazey, George Howe, George H. Bigelow, Mason S. Colburn, F.E. Woodbridge, Warren C. French, Roswell Farnham, Silas P. Carpenter, and John L. Mason. Poland was the chair of the delegation and The delegates supported Benjamin Bristow for the first few ballots before supporting Hayes.

The Democratic state convention was held on June 1, in Montpelier, Vermont. The delegates to the Democratic National Convention were Marcus D. Gilman, Bradley Smalley, P.S. Benjamin, Joseph Rand, James H. Williams, Joseph W. Bliss, C.M. Chase, Thomas B. Kennedy, John Cain, and George M. Fisk. The delegation supported Tilden on both ballots.

Jacob Estey, Charles E. Houghton, Henry N. Sollace, Roswell Farnham, and Alvin C. Welch were the Republican presidential electors. Lucias Robinson, H.L. Robinson, George L. Waterman, Amos Aldrich, and S.L. Goodell were the Democratic presidential electors. Sollace, a postmaster in Bridport, Vermont, was ineligible to be an elector if he held his postmaster position. He resigned in order to serve as an elector and was then appointed to fill the vacancy created by his resignation.

== Results ==
1876 United States presidential election in Vermont
Party	Candidate	Running mate	Popular vote		Electoral vote	
Party	Candidate	Running mate	Count	%	Count	%
Republican	Rutherford B. Hayes of Ohio	William A. Wheeler of New York	44,091	68.30%	5	100.00%
Democratic	Samuel J. Tilden of New York	Thomas A. Hendricks of Indiana	20,254	31.38%	0	0.00%
N/A	Others	Others	208	0.32%	0	0.00%
Total			64,553	100.00%	5	100.00%

== See also ==
- United States presidential elections in Vermont

== Works cited ==
- "Vermont In The Electoral College". The Times. January 20, 1905. p. 1 – via Newspapers.com.
