= 1804 United States presidential election in Vermont =

- November 3, 1804
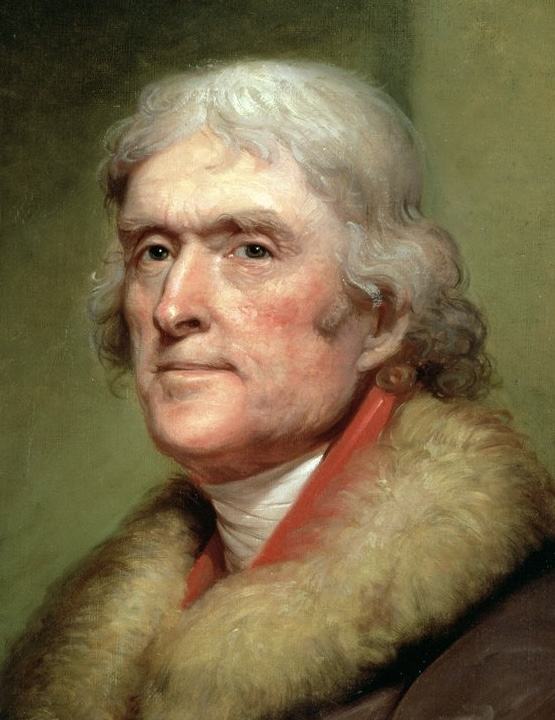
Nominee	Thomas Jefferson
Party	Democratic-Republican
Home state	Virginia
Running mate	George Clinton
Electoral vote	6
President before election
Thomas Jefferson
Democratic-Republican
Elected President
Thomas Jefferson
Democratic-Republican

A presidential election was held in Vermont on November 3, 1804, as part of the 1804 United States presidential election. The Democratic-Republican Party's ticket of incumbent president Thomas Jefferson and former New York governor George Clinton was elected in the Vermont General Assembly.

The electors on the Democratic-Republican ticket were chosen by a margin of between 40 and 70 votes in the joint legislative session. The National Intelligencer reported that the Federalist members voted for an alternate list of Democratic-Republicans. Jefferson won the national election in a landslide over the de facto Federalist candidate, Charles Cotesworth Pinckney.

== General election ==
1804 United States presidential election in Vermont
Party	Candidate
Democratic-Republican	Ezra Butler
Democratic-Republican	William Hunter
Democratic-Republican	Nathaniel Niles
Democratic-Republican	John Noyes
Democratic-Republican	Samuel Shaw
Democratic-Republican	Josiah Wright

== See also ==
- United States presidential elections in Vermont

== Bibliography ==
- Dauer, Manning Julian (2002). "Election of 1804". In Schlesinger, Arthur M. Jr.; Israel, Fred L. (eds.). History of American Presidential Elections, 1789–2001. Vol. 1. Philadelphia: Chelsea House Publishers. pp. 159–82.
- Vermont (1804). Journal of the General Assembly [...]. Rutland.
