= 1900 United States presidential election in Vermont =

- November 6, 1900
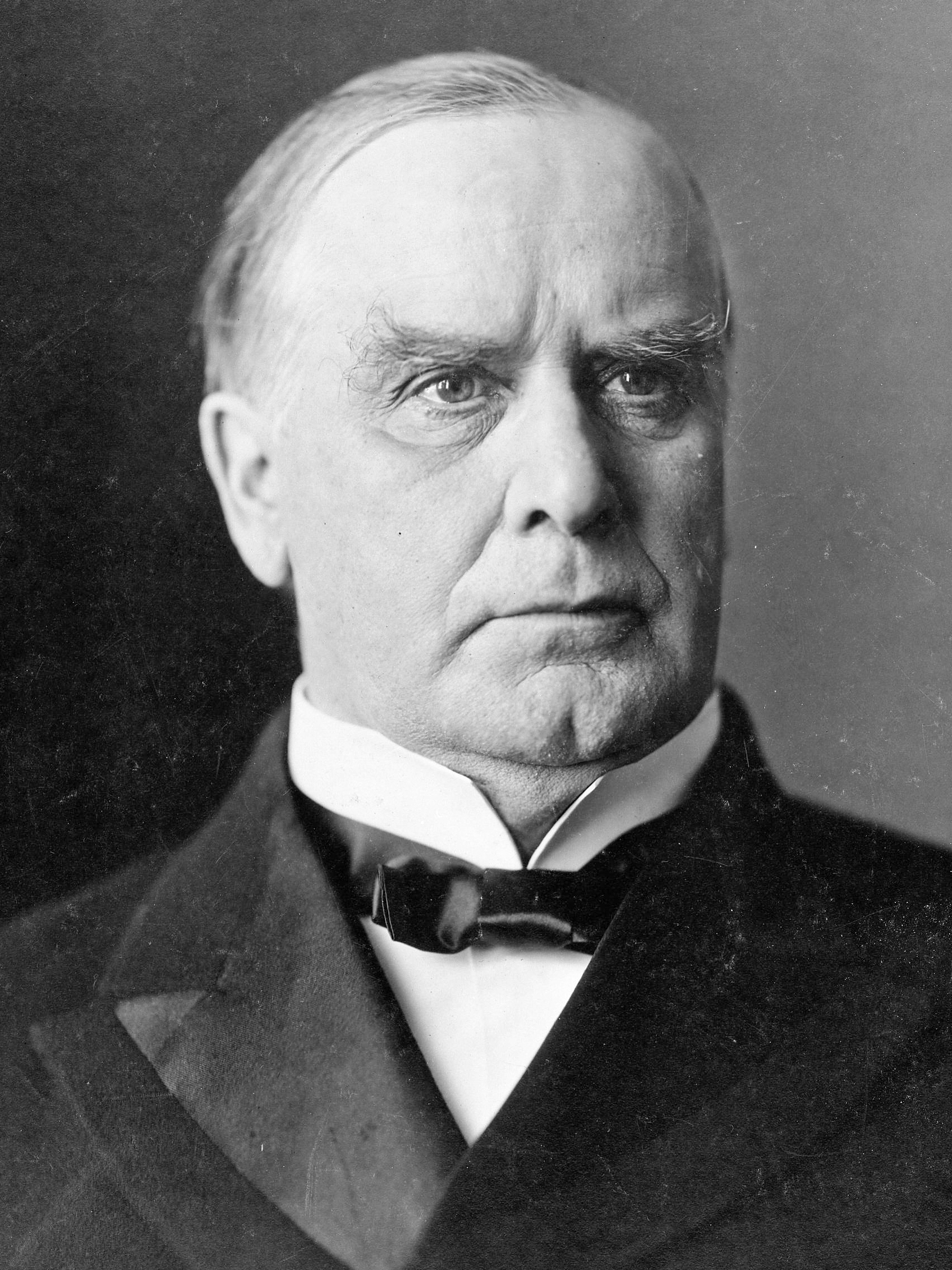

Nominee	William McKinley	William Jennings Bryan
Party	Republican	Democratic
Home state	Ohio	Nebraska
Running mate	Theodore Roosevelt	Adlai E. Stevenson
Electoral vote	4	0
Popular vote	42,569	12,849
Percentage	75.73%	22.86%

McKinley
50–60%
60–70%
70–80%
80–90%
90–100%
Bryan
40–50%
50–60%
70–80%
Tie
40–50%
President before election
William McKinley
Republican
Elected President
William McKinley
Republican

The 1900 United States presidential election in Vermont took place on November 6, 1900, as part of the 1900 United States presidential election. Voters chose four representatives, or electors to the Electoral College, who voted for president and vice president.

Vermont overwhelmingly voted for the Republican nominees, incumbent President William McKinley of Ohio and his running mate Theodore Roosevelt of New York. They defeated the Democratic nominees, former U.S. Representative and 1896 Democratic presidential nominee William Jennings Bryan and his running mate, former Vice President Adlai Stevenson I. McKinley won Vermont by a landslide margin of 52.87% in this rematch of the 1896 presidential election. The return of economic prosperity and recent victory in the Spanish–American War helped McKinley to score a decisive victory.

Four years earlier, McKinley had won Vermont with 80.08% of the popular vote, making it his strongest victory in the 1896 presidential election in terms of percentage in the popular vote as well as the best performance of any presidential candidate in Vermont to date. Vermont would once again be McKinley's strongest state in popular vote percentage, though with a slightly reduced margin of 75.73%.

Bryan had previously lost Vermont to McKinley four years earlier and would later lose the state again in 1908 to William Howard Taft.

== Results ==
1900 United States presidential election in Vermont
Party	Candidate	Running mate	Popular vote		Electoral vote	
Party	Candidate	Running mate	Count	%	Count	%
Republican	William McKinley of Ohio (incumbent)	Theodore Roosevelt of New York	42,569	75.73%	4	100.00%
Democratic	William Jennings Bryan of Nebraska	Adlai Ewing Stevenson I of Illinois	12,849	22.86%	0	0.00%
Prohibition	John Granville Woolley of Illinois	Henry Brewer Metcalf of Rhode Island	383	0.68%	0	0.00%
Populist	Wharton Barker of Pennsylvania	Ignatius Loyola Donnelly of Minnesota	367	0.65%	0	0.00%
N/A	Others	Others	44	0.06%	0	0.00%
Total			56,212	100.00%	4	100.00%

=== Results by county ===
County	William McKinley Republican		William Jennings Bryan Democratic		Various candidates Other parties		Margin		Total votes cast
County	#	%	#	%	#	%	#	%	Total votes cast
Addison	3,286	86.41%	467	12.28%	50	1.31%	2,819	74.13%	3,803
Bennington	2,666	74.57%	871	24.36%	38	1.06%	1,795	50.21%	3,575
Caledonia	2,957	76.79%	817	21.22%	77	2.00%	2,140	55.57%	3,851
Chittenden	3,907	67.26%	1,822	31.37%	80	1.38%	2,085	35.89%	5,809
Essex	758	67.50%	358	31.88%	7	0.62%	400	35.62%	1,123
Franklin	2,738	66.38%	1,316	31.90%	71	1.72%	1,422	34.47%	4,125
Grand Isle	356	68.86%	146	28.24%	15	2.90%	210	40.62%	517
Lamoille	1,742	79.15%	418	18.99%	41	1.86%	1,324	60.15%	2,201
Orange	2,515	75.32%	740	22.16%	84	2.52%	1,775	53.16%	3,339
Orleans	2,749	85.24%	441	13.67%	35	1.09%	2,308	71.57%	3,225
Rutland	5,901	74.66%	1,874	23.71%	129	1.63%	4,027	50.95%	7,904
Washington	3,819	68.94%	1,622	29.28%	99	1.79%	2,197	39.66%	5,540
Windham	3,948	79.02%	1,014	20.30%	34	0.68%	2,934	58.73%	4,996
Windsor	5,227	84.25%	943	15.20%	34	0.55%	4,284	69.05%	6,204
Totals	42,569	75.73%	12,849	22.86%	794	1.41%	29,720	52.87%	56,212

== See also ==
- United States presidential elections in Vermont
