= 1860 United States presidential election in Vermont =

- November 2, 1860
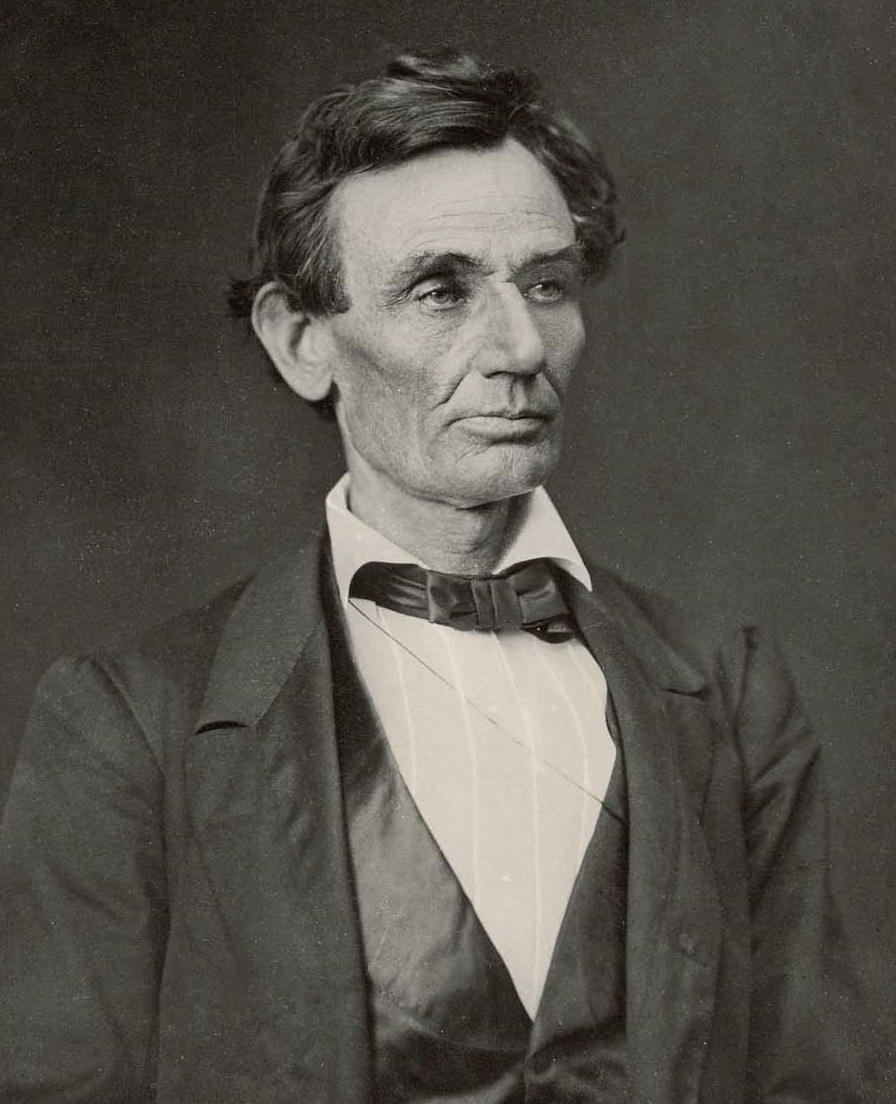

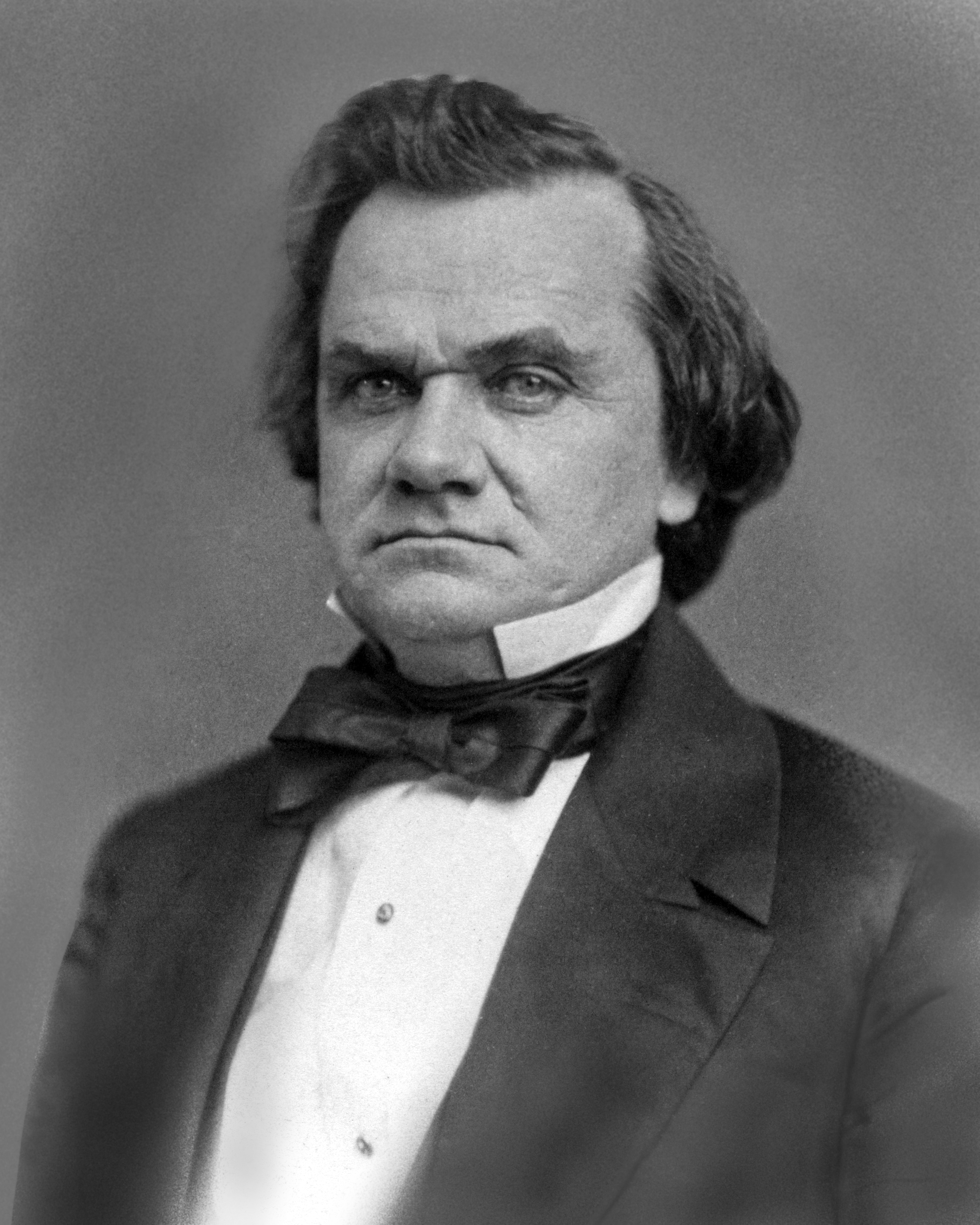
Nominee	Abraham Lincoln	Stephen A. Douglas
Party	Republican	Democratic
Home state	Illinois	Illinois
Running mate	Hannibal Hamlin	Herschel V. Johnson
Electoral vote	5	0
Popular vote	33,808	8,649
Percentage	75.86%	19.41%

Lincoln
40–50%
50–60%
60–70%
70–80%
80–90%
90–100%
Douglas
40–50%
50–60%
60–70%
80–90%
President before election
James Buchanan
Democratic
Elected President
Abraham Lincoln
Republican

The 1860 United States presidential election in Vermont took place on November 2, 1860, as part of the 1860 United States presidential election. Voters chose five electors of the Electoral College, who voted for president and vice president.

Vermont was won by Republican candidate Abraham Lincoln and his running mate Hannibal Hamlin They defeated Democratic candidate Stephen A. Douglas (who himself was born in the Vermont town of Brandon) and his running mate Herschel V. Johnson. Lincoln won the state by a landslide margin of 56.45%.

With 75.86% of the popular vote, Vermont would be Lincoln's strongest victory in terms of percentage in the popular vote.

== Campaign ==
John S. Robinson, Henry Keyes, Jasper Rand, and E.M. Brown were the at-large delegates to the Democratic National Convention in Charleston, South Carolina, with Henry Clark, T.C. Beattie, W.W. White, and E. Plympton as their substitutes. The 1st district was represented by Charles G. Eastman and Pitt W. Hyde (J.A.S. White and John Jackson as substitutes), the 2nd district by Henry E. Stoughton and E.B. Chase (C.N. Davenport and Stephen Thomas as substitutes), and the 3rd district by H.B. Smith and Lucius Robinson (Bradley Smalley and Emory Stewart as substitutes).

== Results ==
1860 United States presidential election in Vermont
Party	Candidate	Votes	%
Republican	Abraham Lincoln	33,808	75.86%
Democratic	Stephen A. Douglas	8,649	19.41%
Southern Democratic	John C. Breckinridge	1,866	4.19%
Constitutional Union	John Bell	217	0.49%
N/A	Others	26	0.06%
Total votes		44,644	100%

=== Results by county ===
1860 United States Presidential Election in Vermont (By County) (Note: In the 1861 Tribune Almanac, the votes of Breckinridge and Bell are 218 and 1,969 respectively. However, it is the opposite in David Leip's US Election Atlas. To avoid conflicting data, the county numbers from the Tribune Almanac for Breckinridge and Bell are swapped to match up with the data in the US Election Atlas.)
County	Abraham Lincoln Republican		Stephen A. Douglas Democratic		John C. Breckinridge Southern Democratic		John Bell Constitutional Union		Total votes cast
County	#	%	#	%	#	%	#	%	Total votes cast
Addison	2,626	86.55%	344	11.34%	47	1.55%	17	0.56%	3,034
Bennington	1,937	70.36%	710	25.79%	94	3.41%	12	0.44%	2,753
Caledonia	2,139	73.03%	581	19.84%	189	6.45%	20	0.68%	2,929
Chittenden	2,241	77.81%	545	18.92%	69	2.40%	25	0.87%	2,880
Essex	646	66.67%	312	32.20%	10	1.03%	1	0.10%	969
Franklin	1,979	71.60%	538	19.46%	227	8.21%	20	0.72%	2,764
Grand Isle	333	71.00%	89	18.98%	41	8.74%	6	1.28%	469
Lamoille	1,280	78.43%	312	19.12%	37	2.27%	3	0.18%	1,632
Orange	2,714	68.94%	973	24.71%	212	5.38%	38	0.97%	3,937
Orleans	1,749	80.67%	293	13.51%	120	5.54%	6	0.28%	2,168
Rutland	4,178	73.75%	1,348	23.80%	116	2.05%	23	0.41%	5,665
Washington	2,941	70.07%	1,209	28.81%	43	1.02%	4	0.10%	4,197
Windham	3,732	79.69%	461	9.84%	473	10.10%	17	0.36%	4,683
Windsor	5,313	80.94%	934	14.23%	291	4.43%	26	0.40%	6,564
Total	33,808	75.73%	8,649	19.37%	1,969	4.41%	218	0.49%	44,644

== See also ==
- United States presidential elections in Vermont

== Works cited ==
- "Vermont Delegates to Charleston". Rutland Weekly Herald and Globe. March 23, 1860. p. 2 – via Newspapers.com.
