= 1824 United States presidential election in Vermont =

- October 26 – December 2, 1824
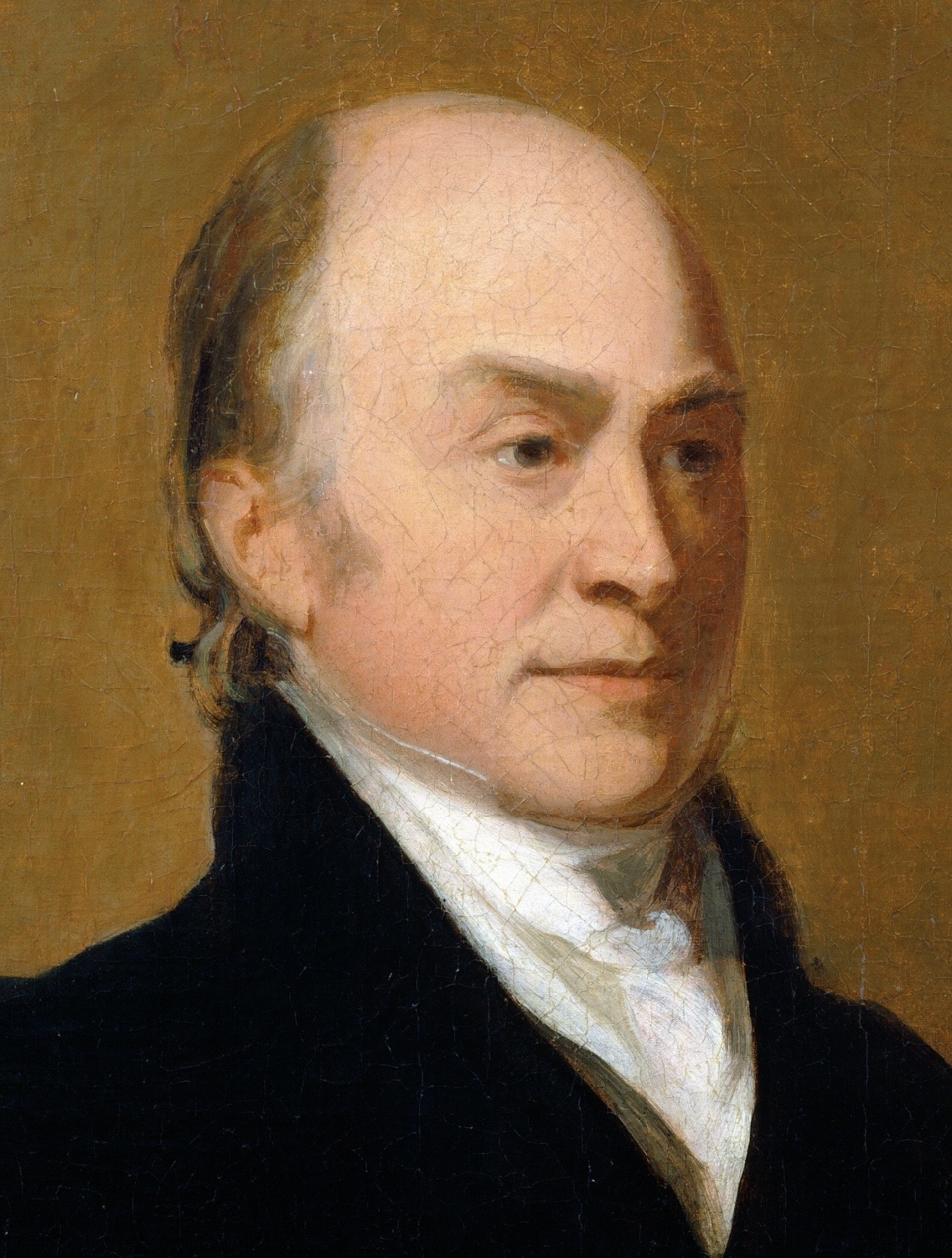
Nominee	John Quincy Adams
Party	Democratic-Republican
Alliance	Adams-Clay Republican
Home state	Massachusetts
Running mate	John C. Calhoun
Electoral vote	7
President before election
James Monroe
Democratic-Republican
Elected President
John Quincy Adams
Democratic-Republican

The 1824 United States presidential election in Vermont took place between October 26 and December 2, 1824, as part of the 1824 United States presidential election. The state legislature chose seven representatives, or electors (the last time they would do this in Vermont) to the Electoral College, who voted for President and Vice President.

During this election, the Democratic-Republican Party was the only major national party, and four different candidates from this party sought the Presidency. Vermont cast seven electoral votes for New England native John Quincy Adams.

== Results ==
1824 United States presidential election in Vermont
Party	Candidate	Votes	Percentage	Electoral votes
Democratic-Republican	John Quincy Adams			7
Democratic-Republican	Henry Clay			0
Democratic-Republican	William H. Crawford			0
Democratic-Republican	Andrew Jackson			0
Totals				7

== See also ==
- United States presidential elections in Vermont
