= United States presidential elections in Vermont =

Presidential elections in Vermont
- Number of elections: 59
- Voted Democratic: 10
- Voted Republican: 33
- Voted Whig: 5
- Voted Democratic-Republican: 6
- Voted Federalist: 2
- Voted other: 3 (Note: William Wirt, 1832; John Quincy Adams, 1828; George Washington, 1792.)
- Voted for winning candidate: 36
- Voted for losing candidate: 22

Following is a table of United States presidential elections in Vermont, ordered by year. Since its admission to statehood in 1791, Vermont has participated in every U.S. presidential election.

Winners of the state are in bold. The shading refers to the state winner, and not the national winner.

== Elections from 1864 to present ==
View source data.

| Year | Winner (nationally) | Votes | Percent | Runner-up (nationally) | Votes | Percent | Other national candidates (Note: For purposes of these lists, other national candidates are defined as those who won at least one electoral vote, or won at least ten percent of the vote in multiple states.) | Votes | Percent | Electoral votes | Notes |
|---|---|---|---|---|---|---|---|---|---|---|---|
| 2024 | Donald Trump | 119,395 | 32.32 | **Kamala Harris** | 235,791 | 63.83 | — | | | 3 | |
| 2020 | **Joe Biden** | 242,820 | 66.09 | Donald Trump | 112,704 | 30.67 | — | | | 3 | |
| 2016 | Donald Trump (Note: Won the electoral college while losing the popular vote) | 95,369 | 30.27 | **Hillary Clinton** | 178,573 | 56.68 | — | | | 3 | |
| 2012 | **Barack Obama** | 199,239 | 66.57 | Mitt Romney | 92,698 | 30.97 | — | | | 3 | |
| 2008 | **Barack Obama** | 219,262 | 67.46 | John McCain | 98,974 | 30.45 | — | | | 3 | |
| 2004 | George W. Bush | 121,180 | 38.80 | **John Kerry** | 184,067 | 58.94 | — | | | 3 | |
| 2000 | George W. Bush | 119,775 | 40.70 | **Al Gore** | 149,022 | 50.63 | — | | | 3 | |
| 1996 | **Bill Clinton** | 137,894 | 53.35 | Bob Dole | 80,352 | 31.09 | Ross Perot | 31,024 | 12.00 | 3 | |
| 1992 | **Bill Clinton** | 133,592 | 46.11 | George H. W. Bush | 88,122 | 30.42 | Ross Perot | 65,991 | 22.78 | 3 | |
| 1988 | **George H. W. Bush** | 124,331 | 51.10 | Michael Dukakis | 115,775 | 47.58 | — | | | 3 | |
| 1984 | **Ronald Reagan** | 135,865 | 57.92 | Walter Mondale | 95,730 | 40.81 | — | | | 3 | |
| 1980 | **Ronald Reagan** | 94,598 | 44.37 | Jimmy Carter | 81,891 | 38.41 | John B. Anderson | 31,760 | 14.90 | 3 | |
| 1976 | Jimmy Carter | 81,044 | 43.14 | **Gerald Ford** | 102,085 | 54.34 | — | | | 3 | |
| 1972 | **Richard Nixon** | 117,149 | 62.66 | George McGovern | 68,174 | 36.47 | — | | | 3 | |
| 1968 | **Richard Nixon** | 85,142 | 52.75 | Hubert Humphrey | 70,255 | 43.53 | George Wallace | 5,104 | 3.16 | 3 | |
| 1964 | **Lyndon B. Johnson** | 108,127 | 66.30 | Barry Goldwater | 54,942 | 33.69 | — | | | 3 | |
| 1960 | John F. Kennedy | 69,186 | 41.35 | **Richard Nixon** | 98,131 | 58.65 | — | | | 3 | |
| 1956 | **Dwight D. Eisenhower** | 110,390 | 72.16 | Adlai Stevenson II | 42,549 | 27.81 | T. Coleman Andrews/ Unpledged Electors (Note: Was allied with a slate of unpledged electors in Louisiana, Mississippi and South Carolina) | — | — | 3 | |
| 1952 | **Dwight D. Eisenhower** | 109,717 | 71.45 | Adlai Stevenson II | 43,355 | 28.23 | — | | | 3 | |
| 1948 | Harry S. Truman | 45,557 | 36.92 | **Thomas E. Dewey** | 75,926 | 61.54 | Strom Thurmond | — | — | 3 | |
| 1944 | Franklin D. Roosevelt | 53,820 | 42.93 | **Thomas E. Dewey** | 71,527 | 57.06 | — | | | 3 | |
| 1940 | Franklin D. Roosevelt | 64,269 | 44.92 | **Wendell Willkie** | 78,371 | 54.78 | — | | | 3 | |
| 1936 | Franklin D. Roosevelt | 62,124 | 43.24 | **Alf Landon** | 81,023 | 56.39 | — | | | 3 | |
| 1932 | Franklin D. Roosevelt | 56,266 | 41.08 | **Herbert Hoover** | 78,984 | 57.66 | — | | | 3 | |
| 1928 | **Herbert Hoover** | 90,404 | 66.87 | Al Smith | 44,440 | 32.87 | — | | | 4 | |
| 1924 | **Calvin Coolidge** | 80,498 | 78.22 | John W. Davis | 16,124 | 15.67 | Robert M. La Follette | 5,964 | 5.79 | 4 | |
| 1920 | **Warren G. Harding** | 68,212 | 75.82 | James M. Cox | 20,919 | 23.25 | Parley P. Christensen | — | — | 4 | |
| 1916 | Woodrow Wilson | 22,708 | 35.22 | **Charles E. Hughes** | 40,250 | 62.43 | — | | | 4 | |
| 1912 | Woodrow Wilson | 15,354 | 24.43 | Theodore Roosevelt | 22,132 | 35.22 | **William H. Taft** | 23,332 | 37.13 | 4 | |
| 1908 | **William H. Taft** | 39,552 | 75.08 | William Jennings Bryan | 11,496 | 21.82 | — | | | 4 | |
| 1904 | **Theodore Roosevelt** | 40,459 | 77.97 | Alton B. Parker | 9,777 | 18.84 | — | | | 4 | |
| 1900 | **William McKinley** | 42,569 | 75.73 | William Jennings Bryan | 12,849 | 22.86 | — | | | 4 | |
| 1896 | **William McKinley** | 51,127 | 80.08 | William Jennings Bryan | 10,640 | 16.66 | — | | | 4 | |
| 1892 | Grover Cleveland | 16,325 | 29.26 | **Benjamin Harrison** | 37,992 | 68.09 | James B. Weaver | 44 | 0.08 | 4 | |
| 1888 | **Benjamin Harrison** | 45,192 | 69.05 | Grover Cleveland | 16,788 | 25.65 | — | | | 4 | |
| 1884 | Grover Cleveland | 17,331 | 29.18 | **James G. Blaine** | 39,514 | 66.52 | — | | | 4 | |
| 1880 | **James A. Garfield** | 45,091 | 69.81 | Winfield S. Hancock | 18,182 | 28.15 | James B. Weaver | 1,212 | 1.88 | 5 | |
| 1876 | **Rutherford B. Hayes** | 44,091 | 68.30 | Samuel J. Tilden | 20,254 | 31.38 | — | | | 5 | |
| 1872 | **Ulysses S. Grant** | 41,480 | 78.29 | Horace Greeley | 10,926 | 20.62 | — | | | 5 | |
| 1868 | **Ulysses S. Grant** | 44,173 | 78.57 | Horatio Seymour | 12,051 | 21.43 | — | | | 5 | |
| 1864 | **Abraham Lincoln** | 42,419 | 76.10 | George B. McClellan | 13,321 | 23.90 | — | | | 5 | |

== Election of 1860 ==
The election of 1860 was a complex realigning election in which the breakdown of the previous two-party alignment culminated in four parties each competing for influence in different parts of the country. The result of the election, with the victory of an ardent opponent of slavery, spurred the secession of eleven states and brought about the American Civil War.

| Year | Winner (nationally) | Votes | Percent | Runner-up (nationally) | Votes | Percent | Runner-up (nationally) | Votes | Percent | Runner-up (nationally) | Votes | Percent | Electoral votes |
|---|---|---|---|---|---|---|---|---|---|---|---|---|---|
| 1860 | **Abraham Lincoln** | 33,808 | 75.86 | Stephen A. Douglas | 8,649 | 19.41 | John C. Breckinridge | 1,866 | 4.19 | John Bell | 217 | 0.49 | 5 |

== Elections from 1828 to 1856 ==
| Year | Winner (nationally) | Votes | Percent | Runner-up (nationally) | Votes | Percent | Other national candidates | Votes | Percent | Electoral votes | Notes |
|---|---|---|---|---|---|---|---|---|---|---|---|
| 1856 | James Buchanan | 10,577 | 20.84 | **John C. Frémont** | 39,561 | 77.96 | Millard Fillmore | 545 | 1.07 | 5 | |
| 1852 | Franklin Pierce | 13,044 | 29.72 | **Winfield Scott** | 22,173 | 50.52 | John P. Hale | 8,621 | 19.64 | 5 | |
| 1848 | **Zachary Taylor** | 23,132 | 48.27 | Lewis Cass | 10,948 | 22.85 | Martin Van Buren | 13,837 | 28.87 | 6 | |
| 1844 | James K. Polk | 18,049 | 36.96 | **Henry Clay** | 26,780 | 54.84 | — | | | 6 | |
| 1840 | **William Henry Harrison** | 32,445 | 63.9 | Martin Van Buren | 18,009 | 35.47 | — | | | 7 | |
| 1836 | Martin Van Buren | 14,037 | 40.07 | **William Henry Harrison** | 20,994 | 59.93 | various (Note: Three other candidates ran and received electoral votes nationally as part of the unsuccessful Whig strategy to defeat Martin Van Buren by running four candidates with local appeal in different regions of the country. The others were Hugh Lawson White, Daniel Webster, and Willie Person Mangum. None of these candidates appeared on the ballot in Vermont.) | | | 7 | |
| 1832 | Andrew Jackson | 7,870 | 24.50 | Henry Clay | 11,152 | 34.71 | **William Wirt** | 13,106 | 40.79 | 7 | |
| 1828 | Andrew Jackson | 8,350 | 25.43 | **John Quincy Adams** | 24,363 | 74.2 | — | | | 7 | |

== Election of 1824 ==
The election of 1824 was a complex realigning election following the collapse of the prevailing Democratic-Republican Party, resulting in four different candidates each claiming to carry the banner of the party, and competing for influence in different parts of the country. The election was the only one in history to be decided by the House of Representatives under the provisions of the Twelfth Amendment to the United States Constitution after no candidate secured a majority of the electoral vote. It was also the only presidential election in which the candidate who received a plurality of electoral votes (Andrew Jackson) did not become president, a source of great bitterness for Jackson and his supporters, who proclaimed the election of Adams a corrupt bargain.

| Year | Winner (nationally) | Votes | Percent | Runner-up (nationally) | Votes | Percent | Runner-up (nationally) | Votes | Percent | Runner-up (nationally) | Votes | Percent | Electoral votes |
|---|---|---|---|---|---|---|---|---|---|---|---|---|---|
| 1824 | Andrew Jackson | no popular vote | | **John Quincy Adams** | no popular vote | | Henry Clay | no popular vote | | William H. Crawford | no popular vote | | 7 |

== Elections from 1792 to 1820 ==
In the election of 1820, incumbent President James Monroe ran effectively unopposed, winning all eight of Vermont’s electoral votes, and all electoral votes nationwide except one vote in New Hampshire. To the extent that a popular vote was held, it was primarily directed to filling the office of vice president.

| Year | Winner (nationally) | Runner-up (nationally) | Electoral votes | Notes |
|---|---|---|---|---|
| 1820 | **James Monroe** | — | 8 | Monroe effectively ran unopposed. |
| 1816 | **James Monroe** | Rufus King | 8 | |
| 1812 | **James Madison** | DeWitt Clinton | 8 | |
| 1808 | **James Madison** | Charles C. Pinckney | 6 | |
| 1804 | **Thomas Jefferson** | Charles C. Pinckney | 6 | |
| 1800 | Thomas Jefferson | **John Adams** | 4 | |
| 1796 | **John Adams** | Thomas Jefferson | 4 | |
| 1792 | **George Washington** | — | 3 | Washington effectively ran unopposed. |

== See also ==
- Elections in Vermont
