= 1808 United States presidential election in Vermont =

- November 4 – December 7, 1808
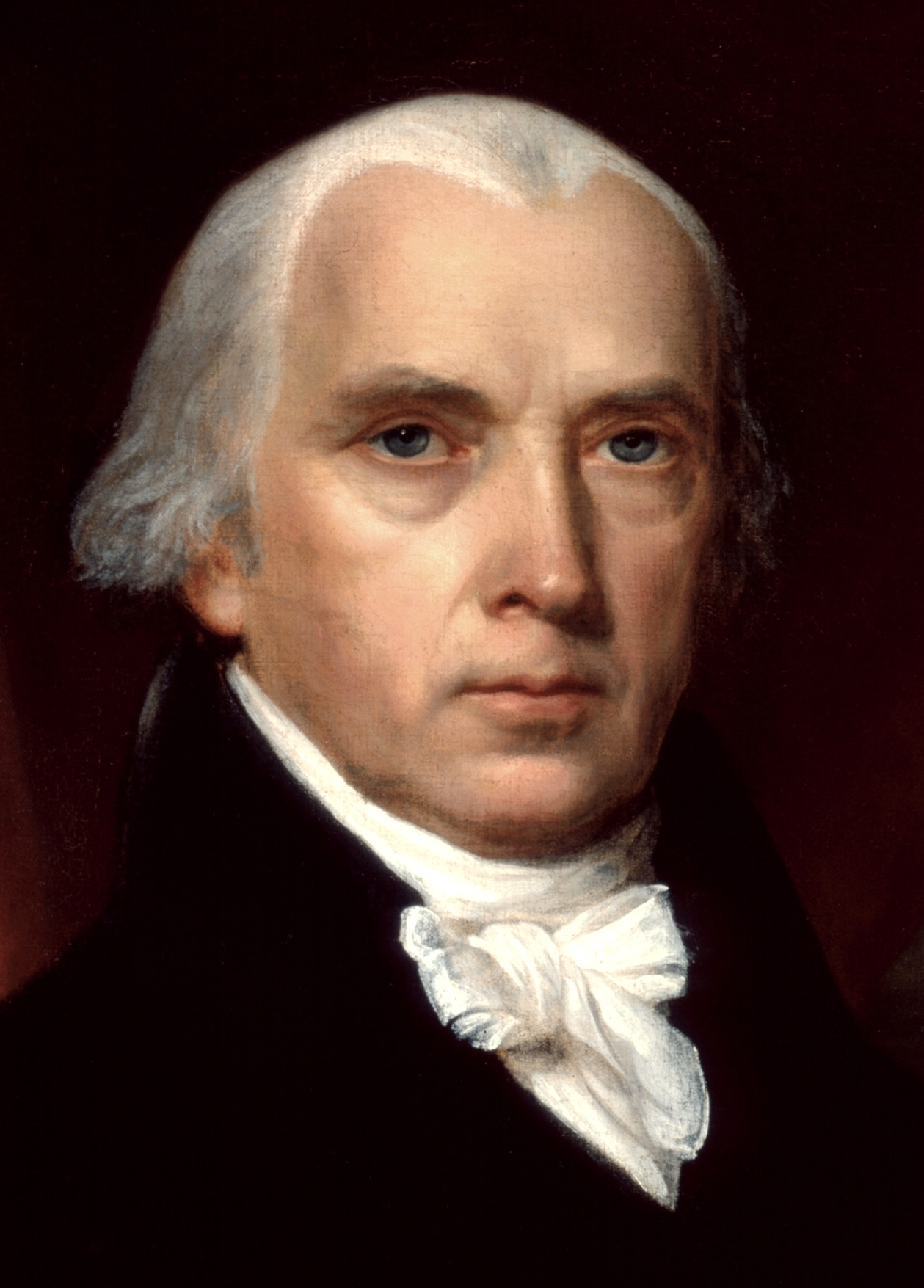
Nominee	James Madison
Party	Democratic-Republican
Home state	Virginia
Running mate	John Langdon
Electoral vote	6
Percentage	100%
President before election
Thomas Jefferson
Democratic-Republican
Elected President
James Madison
Democratic-Republican

The 1808 United States presidential election in Vermont took place between November 4 and December 7, 1808, as part of the 1808 United States presidential election. The state legislature chose six representatives, or electors to the Electoral College, who voted for President and Vice President.

During this election, Vermont cast its six electoral votes to Democratic Republican candidate and Secretary of State James Madison. As the other four New England states cast their electoral votes for Federalist candidate Charles Cotesworth Pinckney, Vermont became the only state in New England to vote for Madison.

== See also ==
- United States presidential elections in Vermont
