= 1908 United States presidential election in Vermont =

- November 3, 1908

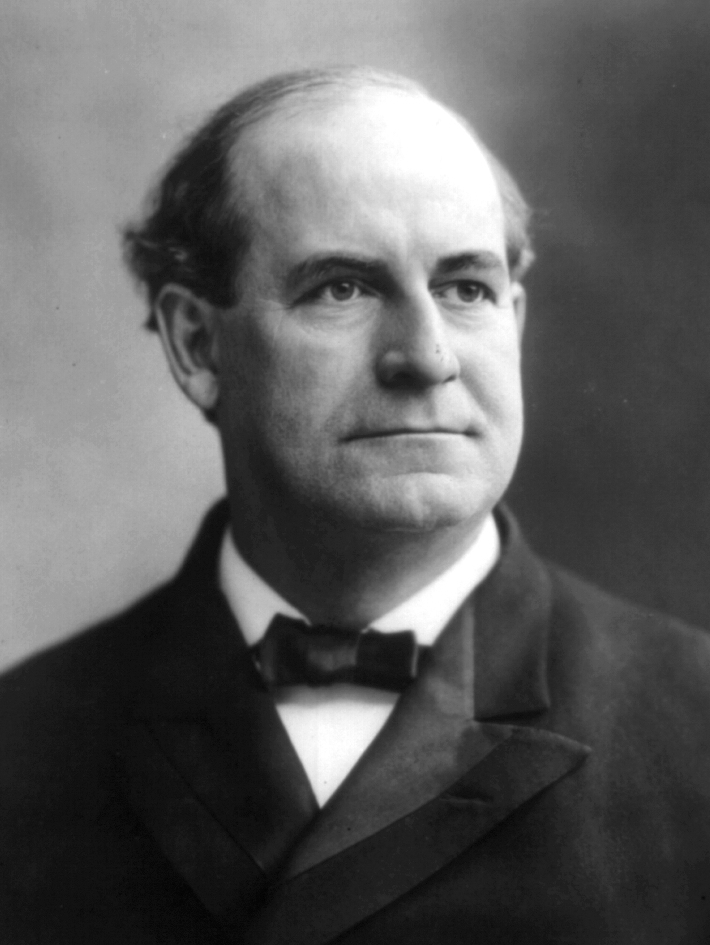
Nominee	William Howard Taft	William Jennings Bryan
Party	Republican	Democratic
Home state	Ohio	Nebraska
Running mate	James S. Sherman	John W. Kern
Electoral vote	4	0
Popular vote	39,552	11,496
Percentage	75.08%	21.82%
County results
Taft
60–70%
70–80%
80–90%
President before election
Theodore Roosevelt
Republican
Elected President
William Howard Taft
Republican

The 1908 United States presidential election in Vermont took place on November 3, 1908, as part of the 1908 United States presidential election. Voters chose four representatives, or electors to the Electoral College, who voted for president and vice president.

Vermont overwhelmingly voted for the Republican nominees, Secretary of War William Howard Taft of Ohio and his running mate James S. Sherman of New York. They defeated the Democratic nominees, former U.S. Representative William Jennings Bryan and his running mate John W. Kern of Indiana. Taft won the state by a landslide margin of 53.26%.

With 75.08% of the popular vote, Vermont would be Taft's strongest victory in terms of percentage in the popular vote.

Bryan had previously lost Vermont to William McKinley in both 1896 and 1900.

== Results ==
1908 United States presidential election in Vermont
Party	Candidate	Running mate	Popular vote		Electoral vote	
Party	Candidate	Running mate	Count	%	Count	%
Republican	William Howard Taft of Ohio	James Schoolcraft Sherman of New York	39,552	75.08%	4	100.00%
Democratic	William Jennings Bryan of Nebraska	John Worth Kern of Indiana	11,496	21.82%	0	0.00%
Independence	Thomas Louis Hisgen of Massachusetts	John Temple Graves of Georgia	804	1.53%	0	0.00%
Prohibition	Eugene Wilder Chafin of Illinois	Aaron Sherman Watkins of Ohio	802	1.52%	0	0.00%
N/A	Others	Others	29	0.06%	0	0.00%
Total			52,683	100.00%	4	100.00%

=== Results by county ===
County	William Howard Taft Republican		William Jennings Bryan Democratic		Various candidates Other parties		Margin		Total votes cast
County	#	%	#	%	#	%	#	%	Total votes cast
Addison	2,986	84.42%	444	12.55%	107	3.03%	2,542	71.87%	3,537
Bennington	2,453	73.66%	748	22.46%	129	3.87%	1,705	51.20%	3,330
Caledonia	2,700	74.63%	764	21.12%	154	4.26%	1,936	53.51%	3,618
Chittenden	3,806	68.29%	1,650	29.61%	117	2.10%	2,156	38.69%	5,573
Essex	744	68.07%	327	29.92%	22	2.01%	417	38.15%	1,093
Franklin	2,360	66.84%	1,048	29.68%	123	3.48%	1,312	37.16%	3,531
Grand Isle	364	64.31%	188	33.22%	14	2.47%	176	31.10%	566
Lamoille	1,455	79.03%	311	16.89%	75	4.07%	1,144	62.14%	1,841
Orange	2,262	74.46%	667	21.96%	109	3.59%	1,595	52.50%	3,038
Orleans	2,535	85.30%	384	12.92%	53	1.78%	2,151	72.38%	2,972
Rutland	5,643	75.69%	1,543	20.70%	269	3.61%	4,100	55.00%	7,455
Washington	3,823	67.86%	1,610	28.58%	201	3.57%	2,213	39.28%	5,634
Windham	3,738	78.56%	906	19.04%	114	2.40%	2,832	59.52%	4,758
Windsor	4,683	81.61%	907	15.81%	148	2.58%	3,776	65.81%	5,738
Totals	39,552	75.07%	11,497	21.82%	1,635	3.10%	28,055	53.25%	52,684

== See also ==
- United States presidential elections in Vermont
