= 1864 United States presidential election in Vermont =

- November 8, 1864

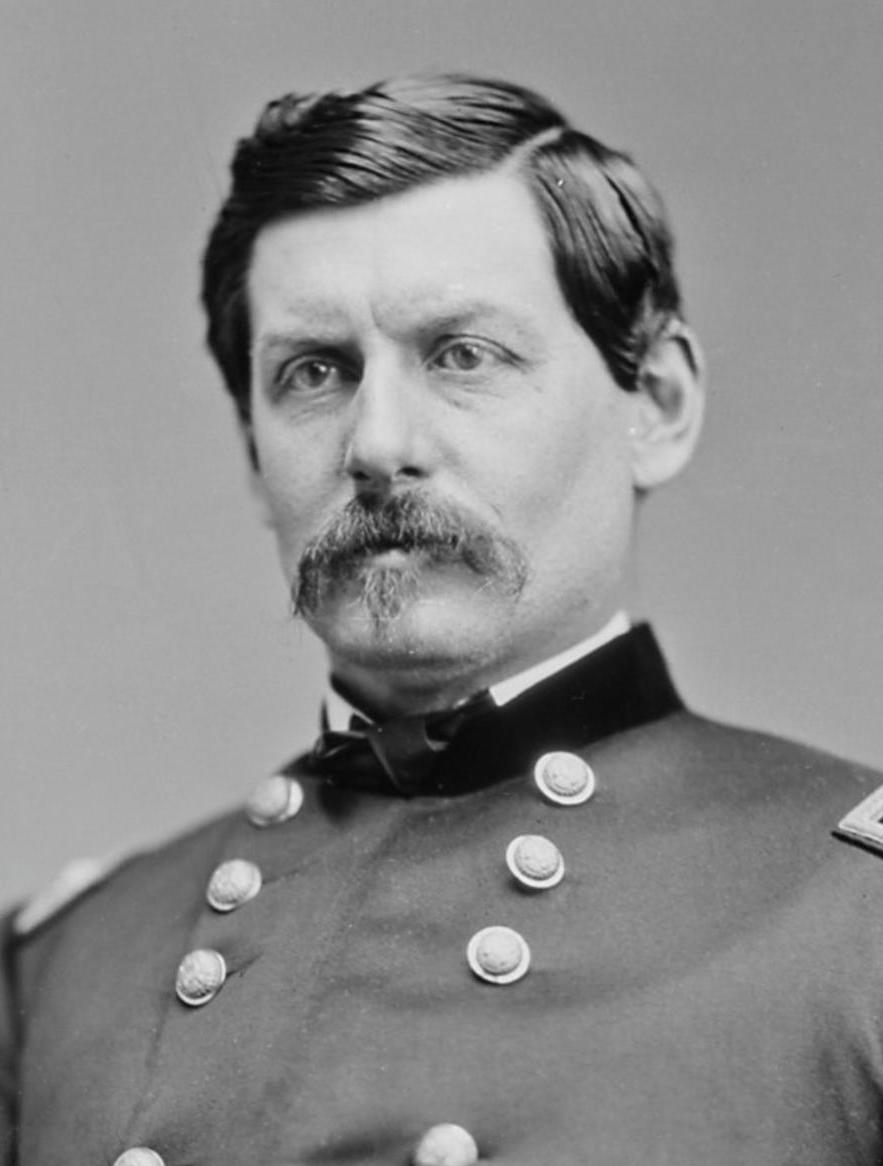
Nominee	Abraham Lincoln	George B. McClellan
Party	National Union	Democratic
Home state	Illinois	New Jersey
Running mate	Andrew Johnson	George H. Pendleton
Electoral vote	5	0
Popular vote	42,420	13,322
Percentage	76.10%	23.90%

Lincoln
50–60%
60–70%
70–80%
80–90%
90–100%
McClellan
50–60%
60–70%
80–90%
90–100%
President before election
Abraham Lincoln
Republican
Elected President
Abraham Lincoln
National Union

The 1864 United States presidential election in Vermont took place on November 8, 1864, as part of the 1864 United States presidential election. Voters chose five representatives, or electors to the Electoral College, who voted for president and vice president.

Vermont voted for the National Union candidate, incumbent Republican President Abraham Lincoln and his running mate Andrew Johnson. They defeated the Democratic candidate, George B. McClellan and his running mate George H. Pendleton. Lincoln won the state by a wide margin of 52.20%.

With 76.10% of the popular vote, Lincoln's victory within the state would be his second strongest victory in the country in terms of percentage in the popular vote after Kansas.

== Results ==
1864 United States presidential election in Vermont
Party	Candidate	Votes	Percentage	Electoral votes
National Union	Abraham Lincoln (incumbent)	42,420	76.10%	5
Democratic	George B. McClellan	13,322	23.90%	0
Totals		55,742	100.00%	5

== See also ==
- United States presidential elections in Vermont
