= 1892 United States presidential election in Vermont =

- November 8, 1892
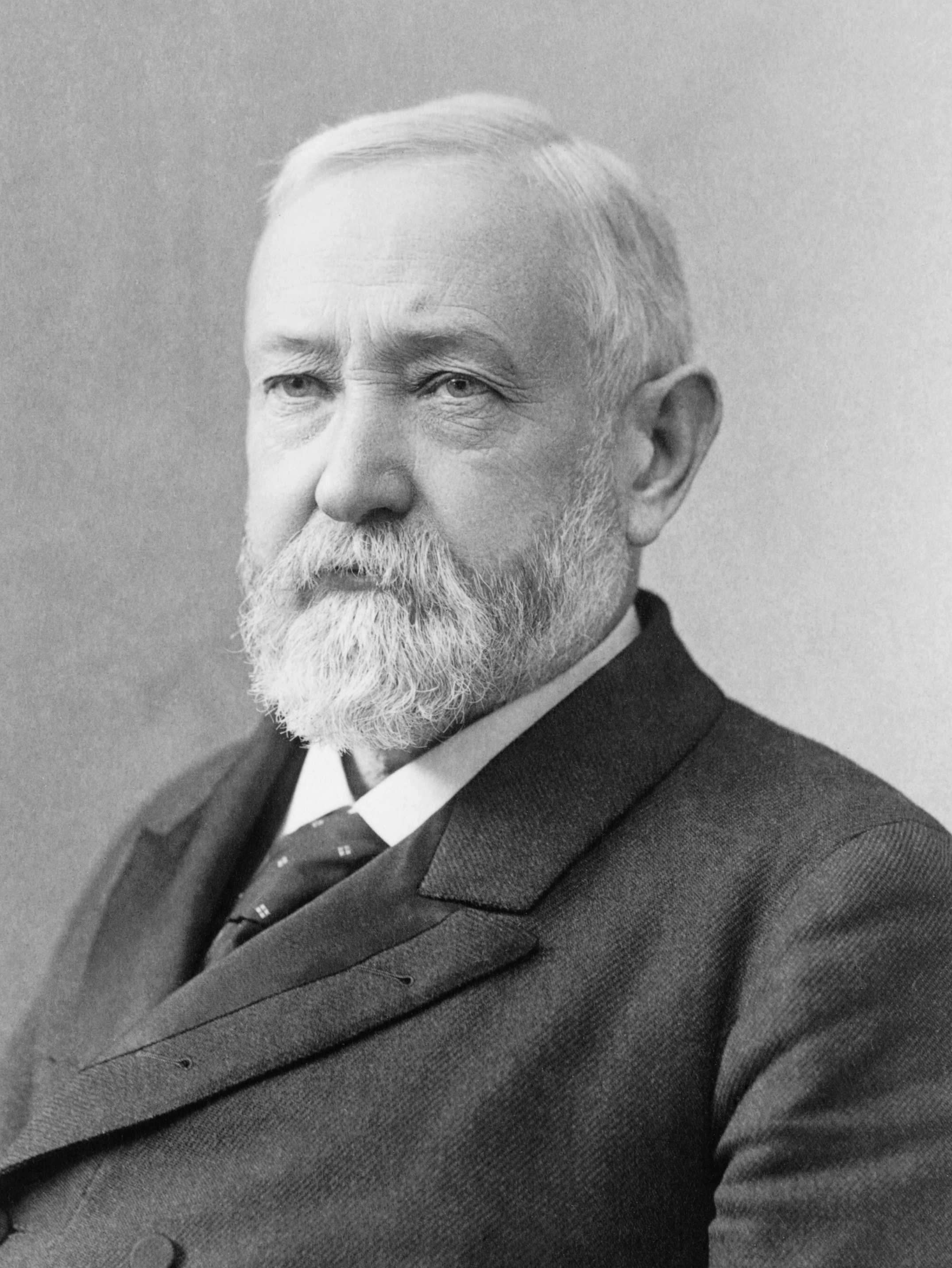

| Nominee | Benjamin Harrison | Grover Cleveland |
| Party | Republican | Democratic |
| Home state | Indiana | New York |
| Running mate | Whitelaw Reid | Adlai Stevenson I |
| Electoral vote | 4 | 0 |
| Popular vote | 37,992 | 16,325 |
| Percentage | 68.09% | 29.26% |

Harrison
40–50%
50–60%
60–70%
70–80%
80–90%
90–100%
Cleveland
50–60%
60–70%
Tie
40–50%
President before election
Benjamin Harrison
Republican
Elected President
Grover Cleveland
Democratic

The 1892 United States presidential election in Vermont took place on November 8, 1892, as part of the 1892 United States presidential election. Voters chose four representatives, or electors to the Electoral College, who voted for president and vice president.

Vermont voted for the Republican nominee, incumbent President Benjamin Harrison, over the Democratic nominee, former President Grover Cleveland, who was running for a second, non-consecutive term. Harrison won Vermont by a margin of 38.83%.

With 68.09% of the popular vote, Vermont would be Harrison's strongest victory in terms of percentage in the popular vote.

== Results ==
1892 United States presidential election in Vermont
| Party | Candidate | Running mate | Popular vote | | Electoral vote | |
| Party | Candidate | Running mate | Count | % | Count | % |
|---|---|---|---|---|---|---|
| Republican | Benjamin Harrison of Indiana (incumbent) | Whitelaw Reid of New York | 37,992 | 68.09% | 4 | 100.00% |
| Democratic | Grover Cleveland of New York | Adlai Ewing Stevenson I of Illinois | 16,325 | 29.26% | 0 | 0.00% |
| Prohibition | John Bidwell of California | James Britton Cranfill of Texas | 1,424 | 2.55% | 0 | 0.00% |
| Populist | James Baird Weaver of Iowa | James Gaven Field of Virginia | 44 | 0.08% | 0 | 0.00% |
| N/A | Others | Others | 11 | 0.02% | 0 | 0.00% |
| Total | | | 55,796 | 100.00% | 4 | 100.00% |

=== Results by county ===
| County | Benjamin Harrison Republican | | Stephen Grover Cleveland Democratic | | John Bidwell Prohibition | | James Baird Weaver People's | | Various candidates Write-ins | | Margin | | Total votes cast |
| County | # | % | # | % | # | % | # | % | # | % | # | % | Total votes cast |
|---|---|---|---|---|---|---|---|---|---|---|---|---|---|
| Addison | 3,146 | 80.73% | 621 | 15.94% | 129 | 3.31% | 0 | 0.00% | 1 | 0.03% | 2,525 | 64.79% | 3,897 |
| Bennington | 2,196 | 64.21% | 1,155 | 33.77% | 69 | 2.02% | 0 | 0.00% | | | 1,041 | 30.44% | 3,420 |
| Caledonia | 2,646 | 65.27% | 1,222 | 30.14% | 156 | 3.85% | 29 | 0.72% | 1 | 0.02% | 1,424 | 35.13% | 4,054 |
| Chittenden | 3,418 | 62.58% | 1,952 | 35.74% | 91 | 1.67% | 0 | 0.00% | 1 | 0.02% | 1,466 | 26.84% | 5,462 |
| Essex | 721 | 61.36% | 418 | 35.57% | 36 | 3.06% | 0 | 0.00% | | | 303 | 25.79% | 1,175 |
| Franklin | 2,540 | 63.22% | 1,353 | 33.67% | 123 | 3.06% | 0 | 0.00% | 2 | 0.05% | 1,187 | 29.54% | 4,018 |
| Grand Isle | 349 | 64.75% | 177 | 32.84% | 13 | 2.41% | 0 | 0.00% | | | 172 | 31.91% | 539 |
| Lamoille | 1,470 | 72.16% | 517 | 25.38% | 49 | 2.41% | 1 | 0.05% | | | 953 | 46.78% | 2,037 |
| Orange | 2,395 | 66.33% | 1,088 | 30.13% | 126 | 3.49% | 0 | 0.00% | 2 | 0.06% | 1,307 | 36.19% | 3,611 |
| Orleans | 2,358 | 76.34% | 631 | 20.43% | 97 | 3.14% | 3 | 0.10% | | | 1,727 | 55.91% | 3,089 |
| Rutland | 5,210 | 66.50% | 2,426 | 30.96% | 196 | 2.50% | 3 | 0.04% | | | 2,784 | 35.53% | 7,835 |
| Washington | 3,134 | 60.28% | 1,940 | 37.31% | 121 | 2.33% | 4 | 0.08% | | | 1,194 | 22.97% | 5,199 |
| Windham | 3,656 | 69.52% | 1,496 | 28.45% | 104 | 1.98% | 1 | 0.02% | 2 | 0.04% | 2,160 | 41.07% | 5,259 |
| Windsor | 4,753 | 76.80% | 1,329 | 21.47% | 105 | 1.70% | 1 | 0.02% | 1 | 0.02% | 3,424 | 55.32% | 6,189 |
| Totals | 37,992 | 68.11% | 16,325 | 29.26% | 1,415 | 2.54% | 42 | 0.08% | 10 | 0.02% | 21,667 | 38.84% | 55,784 |

== See also ==
- United States presidential elections in Vermont
