= 1904 United States presidential election in Vermont =

- November 8, 1904
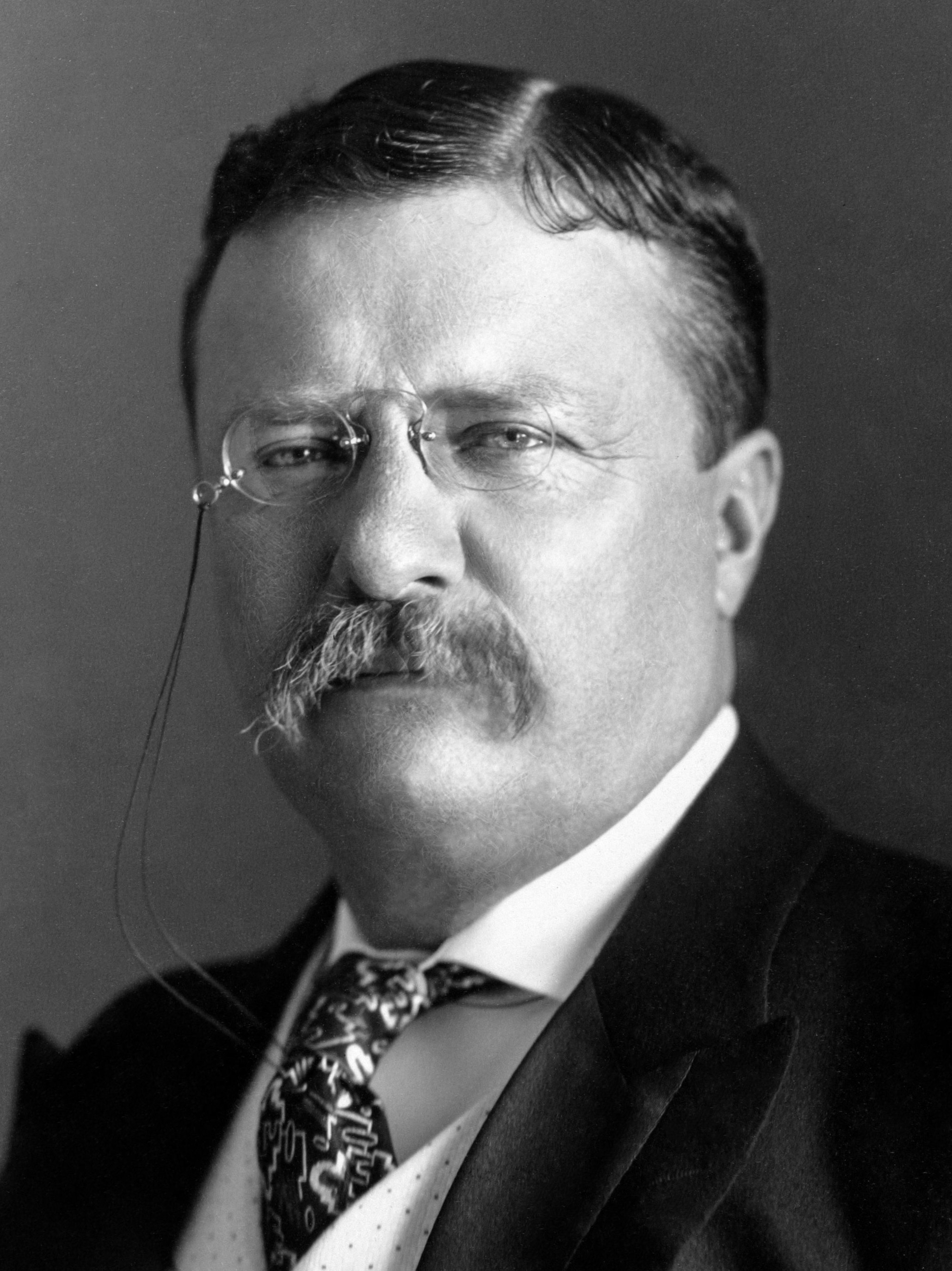

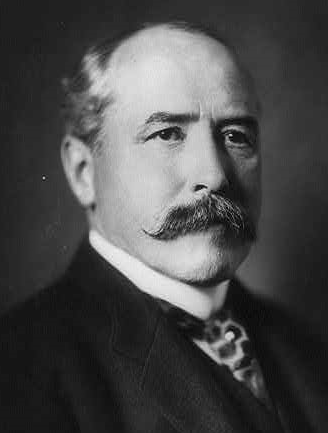
Nominee	Theodore Roosevelt	Alton B. Parker
Party	Republican	Democratic
Home state	New York	New York
Running mate	Charles W. Fairbanks	Henry G. Davis
Electoral vote	4	0
Popular vote	40,459	9,777
Percentage	77.97%	18.84%

Roosevelt
50–60%
60–70%
70–80%
80–90%
90–100%
President before election
Theodore Roosevelt
Republican
Elected President
Theodore Roosevelt
Republican

The 1904 United States presidential election in Vermont took place on November 8, 1904, as part of the 1904 United States presidential election. Voters chose four representatives, or electors to the Electoral College, who voted for president and vice president.

Vermont overwhelmingly voted for the Republican nominee, President Theodore Roosevelt and his running mate Charles W. Fairbanks of Indiana. They defeated the Democratic nominees, former Chief Judge of New York Court of Appeals Alton B. Parker and his running mate, former US Senator Henry G. Davis of West Virginia. Roosevelt won the state by a landslide margin of 59.13%.

With 77.97% of the popular vote, Vermont would be Roosevelt's strongest victory in terms of percentage of the popular vote.

== Results ==
1904 United States presidential election in Vermont
Party	Candidate	Running mate	Popular vote		Electoral vote	
Party	Candidate	Running mate	Count	%	Count	%
Republican	Theodore Roosevelt of New York (incumbent)	Charles Warren Fairbanks of Indiana	40,459	77.97%	4	100.00%
Democratic	Alton Brooks Parker of New York	Henry Gassaway Davis of West Virginia	9,777	18.84%	0	0.00%
Socialist	Eugene Victor Debs of Indiana	Benjamin Hanford of New York	859	1.66%	0	0.00%
Prohibition	Silas Comfort Swallow of Pennsylvania	George Washington Carroll of Texas	792	1.53%	0	0.00%
N/A	Others	Others	1	0.01%	0	0.00%
Total			51,888	100.00%	4	100.00%

=== Results by county ===
County	Theodore Roosevelt Republican		Alton Brooks Parker Democratic		Eugene Victor Debs Socialist		Silas Comfort Swallow Prohibition		Margin		Total votes cast
County	#	%	#	%	#	%	#	%	#	%	Total votes cast
Addison	3,146	87.20%	366	10.14%	19	0.53%	76	2.11%	2,780	77.05%	3,608 (Note: One write-in vote was recorded from this county.)
Bennington	2,419	74.29%	745	22.88%	44	1.35%	48	1.47%	1,674	51.41%	3,256
Caledonia	2,944	81.53%	580	16.06%	26	0.72%	61	1.69%	2,364	65.47%	3,611
Chittenden	3,848	70.61%	1,432	26.28%	97	1.78%	73	1.34%	2,416	44.33%	5,450
Essex	750	75.53%	233	23.46%	5	0.50%	5	0.50%	517	52.06%	993
Franklin	2,522	72.22%	881	25.23%	13	0.37%	76	2.18%	1,641	46.99%	3,492
Grand Isle	343	73.61%	109	23.39%	4	0.86%	10	2.15%	234	50.21%	466
Lamoille	1,521	81.73%	296	15.91%	1	0.05%	43	2.31%	1,225	65.82%	1,861
Orange	2,259	77.13%	587	20.04%	14	0.48%	69	2.36%	1,672	57.08%	2,929
Orleans	2,563	87.30%	328	11.17%	3	0.10%	42	1.43%	2,235	76.12%	2,936
Rutland	5,772	77.12%	1,367	18.27%	248	3.31%	97	1.30%	4,405	58.86%	7,484
Washington	3,807	72.07%	1,247	23.61%	148	2.80%	80	1.51%	2,560	48.47%	5,282
Windham	3,735	78.60%	809	17.02%	153	3.22%	55	1.16%	2,926	61.57%	4,752
Windsor	4,830	83.74%	797	13.82%	84	1.46%	57	0.99%	4,033	69.92%	5,768
Totals	40,459	77.98%	9,777	18.84%	859	1.66%	792	1.53%	30,682	59.13%	51,887

== See also ==
- United States presidential elections in Vermont
