= 1896 United States presidential election in Vermont =

- November 3, 1896

Nominee	William McKinley	William Jennings Bryan
Party	Republican	Democratic
Alliance		Populist
Home state	Ohio	Nebraska
Running mate	Garret Hobart	Arthur Sewall
Electoral vote	4	0
Popular vote	51,127	10,640
Percentage	80.08%	16.66%

McKinley
40–50%
50–60%
60–70%
70–80%
80–90%
90–100%
Tie
50%
President before election
Grover Cleveland
Democratic
Elected President
William McKinley
Republican

The 1896 United States presidential election in Vermont took place on November 3, 1896, as part of the 1896 United States presidential election. Voters chose four representatives, or electors to the Electoral College, who voted for president and vice president.

Vermont overwhelmingly voted for the Republican nominees, former governor of Ohio William McKinley and his running mate Garret Hobart of New Jersey. They defeated the Democratic and Populist nominees, former representative from Nebraska William Jennings Bryan and his running mate Arthur Sewall of Maine.

With 80.08% of the popular vote, Vermont would be McKinley's strongest victory in the 1896 presidential election in terms of percentage in the popular vote, and remains the best performance of any presidential candidate in Vermont to date. McKinley won Vermont by a landslide margin of 63.42%, which is the second-best performance by the Republican Party in a state in any presidential election behind only Barry Goldwater in Mississippi in 1964 – ironically the first election when Vermont voted for a Democratic candidate.

Bryan, running on a platform of free silver, appealed strongly to Western miners and farmers in the 1896 election, but had practically no appeal in the Northeastern state of Vermont. In fact, with only 16.66% of the popular vote Bryan's performance in Vermont was the second weakest of any Democratic presidential candidate to date only after John W. Davis' 15.67% in 1924.

Bryan would lose Vermont to McKinley again four years later and would later lose the state again in 1908 to William Howard Taft.

== Results ==
1896 United States presidential election in Vermont
Party	Candidate	Votes	Percentage	Electoral votes
Republican	William McKinley	51,127	80.08%	4
Democratic	William Jennings Bryan	10,179	15.94%	0
Populist	William Jennings Bryan	461	0.72%	0
Total	William Jennings Bryan	10,640	16.66%	0
National Democratic	John M. Palmer	1,331	2.08%	0
Prohibition	Joshua Levering	733	1.15%	0
No party	Write-ins	16	0.03%	0
Invalid or blank votes				—
Totals		63,847	100.00%	4
Voter turnout				—

=== Results by county ===
County	William McKinley Republican		William Jennings Bryan Democratic		John McAuley Palmer National Democratic		Joshua Levering Prohibition		Margin		Total votes cast
County	#	%	#	%	#	%	#	%	#	%	Total votes cast
Addison	4,314	89.17%	404	8.35%	36	0.74%	81	1.68%	3,910	80.82%	4,838
Bennington	3,086	80.39%	656	17.09%	61	1.59%	36	0.94%	2,430	63.30%	3,839
Caledonia	3,474	78.65%	729	16.50%	120	2.72%	94	2.13%	2,745	62.15%	4,417
Chittenden	4,743	75.26%	1,416	22.47%	89	1.41%	54	0.86%	3,327	52.79%	6,302
Essex	873	72.99%	277	23.16%	33	2.76%	13	1.09%	596	49.83%	1,196
Franklin	3,444	72.16%	1,150	24.09%	107	2.24%	72	1.51%	2,294	48.06%	4,773
Grand Isle	426	69.04%	158	25.61%	31	5.02%	2	0.32%	268	43.44%	617
Lamoille	2,061	80.79%	440	17.25%	23	0.90%	27	1.06%	1,621	63.54%	2,551
Orange	3,067	80.20%	567	14.83%	121	3.16%	69	1.80%	2,500	65.38%	3,824
Orleans	3,412	86.25%	442	11.17%	56	1.42%	46	1.16%	2,970	75.08%	3,956
Rutland	6,794	78.00%	1,661	19.07%	161	1.85%	89	1.02%	5,133	58.93%	8,710
Washington	4,476	73.10%	1,396	22.80%	177	2.89%	66	1.08%	3,080	50.30%	6,123
Windham	4,829	84.14%	670	11.67%	190	3.31%	50	0.87%	4,159	72.47%	5,739
Windsor	6,128	88.02%	674	9.68%	126	1.81%	34	0.49%	5,454	78.34%	6,962
Totals	51,127	80.08%	10,640	16.66%	1,331	2.08%	733	1.15%	40,487	63.41%	63,847

== See also ==
- United States presidential elections in Vermont
