= Deputy Premier of Quebec =

Canadian provincial position

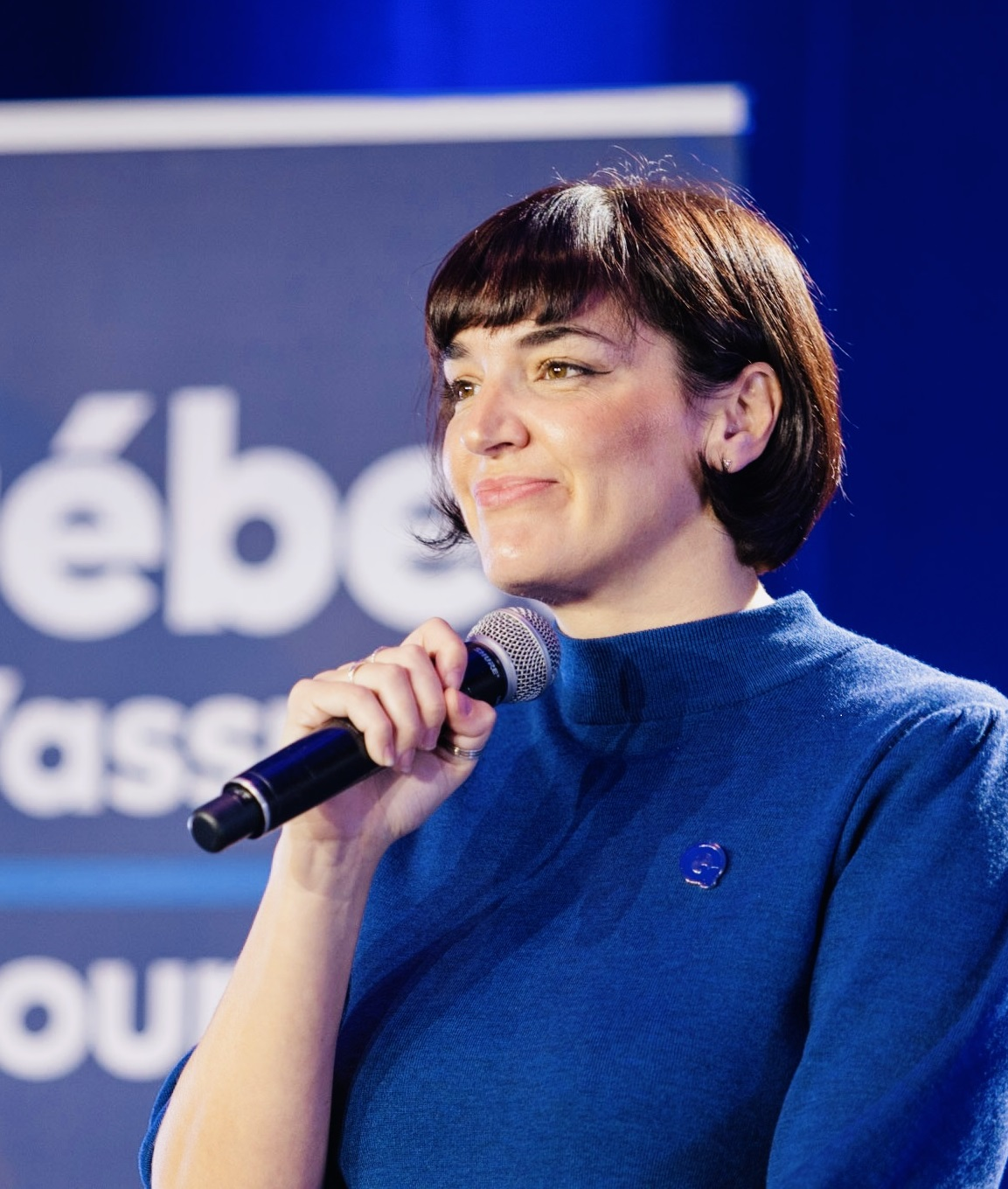
- Incumbent; Catherine Gentilcore since October 21, 2026
- Status: Deputy head of government
- Member of: Cabinet; National Assembly
- Reports to: Premier; National Assembly
- Seat: Quebec City
- Nominator: Premier
- Appointer: Lieutenant governor
- Term length: At His Majesty's pleasure
- Formation: 1960
- First holder: Georges-Émile Lapalme

The deputy premier of Quebec (French: Vice-premier ministre du Québec (masculine) or Vice-première ministre du Québec (feminine)), is the deputy head of government in Quebec. The position is nominated by the premier of Quebec, and they serve on the Executive Council of Quebec as a Cabinet minister. They help the current premier if they are unable to attend functions executed by the premier.

There was no deputy premier until July 1960. In the 1960s, the post was sometimes referred to as the vice president of the Executive Council.

The post has been temporarily vacant four times: when Jean-Jacques Bertrand became premier after the death Daniel Johnson, Sr., after the death of deputy premier Pierre Laporte, after premier François Legault shuffled his cabinet on September 10, 2025, and after Christine Fréchette became premier after Legault's resignation. Besides Bertrand, two other deputy premiers, Bernard Landry and Pauline Marois, later became premier, though both did so some years after their tenure as deputy premier had ended. The longest-serving deputy premier was Lise Bacon at 8 years and 30 days. Michelle Courchesne was the shortest serving at 4 months, 5 days. Out of 23 deputy premiers, 10 have been women.

== List ==
Name	District (Region)	Took office	Left office	Party	Premier(s)
Georges-Émile Lapalme	Montréal-Outremont (Montreal West)	1960	1964	Liberal	Jean Lesage
Paul Gérin-Lajoie	Vaudreuil-Soulanges (Montérégie)	1964	1966	Liberal	Jean Lesage
Jean-Jacques Bertrand	Missisquoi (Eastern Townships)	1966	1968	Union Nationale	Daniel Johnson Sr.
none	n.a.	26 September 1968	11 December 1968	Union Nationale	Jean-Jacques Bertrand
Jean-Guy Cardinal	Bagot (Montérégie)	1968	1970	Union Nationale	Jean-Jacques Bertrand
Pierre Laporte	Chambly (Montérégie)	1970	17 October 1970	Liberal	Robert Bourassa
none	n.a.	17 October 1970	1972	Liberal	Robert Bourassa
Gérard D. Levesque	Bonaventure (Gaspésie—Îles-de-la-Madeleine)	1972	1976	Liberal	Robert Bourassa
Jacques-Yvan Morin	Sauvé (Montreal East)	1976	1984	Parti Québécois	René Lévesque
Camille Laurin	Bourget (Montreal East)	1984	1984	Parti Québécois	René Lévesque
Marc-André Bédard	Chicoutimi (Saguenay–Lac-Saint-Jean)	1984	1985	Parti Québécois	René Lévesque; Pierre Marc Johnson
Lise Bacon	Chomedey (Laval)	1985	1994	Liberal	Robert Bourassa
Monique Gagnon-Tremblay	Saint-François (Eastern Townships)	1994	1994	Liberal	Daniel Johnson Jr.
Bernard Landry	Verchères (Montérégie)	1994	2001	Parti Québécois	Jacques Parizeau; Lucien Bouchard
Pauline Marois	Taillon (Montérégie)	2001	2003	Parti Québécois	Bernard Landry
Monique Gagnon-Tremblay	Saint-François (Eastern Townships)	2003	2005	Liberal	Jean Charest
Jacques Dupuis	Saint-Laurent (Montreal West)	2005	2007	Liberal	Jean Charest
Nathalie Normandeau	Bonaventure (Gaspésie—Îles-de-la-Madeleine)	2007	2011	Liberal	Jean Charest
Line Beauchamp	Bourassa-Sauvé (Montreal North)	2011	2012	Liberal	Jean Charest
Michelle Courchesne	Fabre (Laval)	2012	2012	Liberal	Jean Charest
François Gendron	Abitibi-Ouest (Abitibi-Témiscamingue)	2012	2014	Parti Québécois	Pauline Marois
Lise Thériault	Anjou–Louis-Riel (Montreal)	23 April 2014	11 October 2017	Liberal	Philippe Couillard
Dominique Anglade	Saint-Henri–Sainte-Anne (Montreal)	11 October 2017	18 October 2018	Liberal	Philippe Couillard
Geneviève Guilbault	Louis-Hébert (Capitale-Nationale)	18 October 2018	10 September 2025	Coalition Avenir Québec	François Legault
none	n.a.	10 September 2025	21 April 2026	Coalition Avenir Québec	François Legault
Ian Lafrenière	Vachon (Montérégie)	21 April 2026	21 October 2026	Coalition Avenir Québec	Christine Fréchette
Catherine Gentilcore	Terrebonne (Lanaudière)	21 October 2026		Parti Québécois	Paul St-Pierre Plamondon

== See also ==
- List of Quebec general elections
- Timeline of Quebec history
- National Assembly of Quebec
- List of premiers of Quebec
- List of leaders of the Official Opposition (Quebec)
- List of third party leaders (Quebec)
- History of Quebec

For more lists of this type, see Lists of office-holders.
