= Guy Hardy =

Guy Hardy may refer to:

- Guy U. Hardy (1872–1947), United States Representative
- Guy Hardy (Canadian politician) (1950–2025), member of the National Assembly of Quebec
