= Christopher Skeete =

Canadian politician (born 1979)

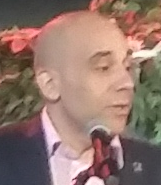
- Skeete in 2019

Quebec Minister of International Relations and La Francophonie
- In office September 10, 2025 – October 21, 2026
- Premier: François Legault; Christine Fréchette
- Preceded by: Martine Biron
- Succeeded by: Dieudonné Ella Oyono

Member of the National Assembly of Quebec for Sainte-Rose
- In office October 1, 2018 – August 27, 2026
- Preceded by: Jean Habel
- Succeeded by: Cécile Tremblay

Personal details
- Born: September 20, 1979 (age 47) Laval, Quebec, Canada
- Party: Coalition Avenir Québec

Christopher Skeete MNA (born September 20, 1979) is a Canadian politician who was elected to the National Assembly of Quebec in the 2018 provincial election. He represented the electoral district of Sainte-Rose as a member of the Coalition Avenir Québec until 2026.

== Life and career ==
Skeete was born on September 20, 1979, in Laval, Quebec. He attended Vanier college. He holds a Masters of Business Administration (MBA) from the ESG-UQÀM in Montréal as well as a bachelor's degree in political science and public affairs from Concordia University.

Earlier in his career, Skeete worked as a customs officer and also as the director of regional operations for a veterinary clinic. With his wife, he started CasMedic, a firm that provides mobile blood tests to patients in their homes as well as vaccinations to clients at pharmacies. Before 2018, Skeete was vice-president for the West-du-Québec region of the Coalition Avenir Québec party.

He was previously a candidate for the CAQ in the district of Vimont in the 2012 election, and in the district of Fabre in the 2014 election.

On October 18, 2018, he was named parliamentary secretary to the premier François Legault. He was named the Parliamentary Assistant to the Premier for Relations with English-Speaking Quebecers on November 7, 2018. On February 24, 2021, he was appointed Parliamentary Assistant to the Minister Responsible for the Fight Against Racism. He became Minister of International Relations and La Francophonie in 2025.

== Electoral record ==
2026 Quebec general election: Sainte-Rose
** Preliminary results — Not yet official **
Party	Candidate	Votes	%	±%
Liberal	Cécile Tremblay	14,123	37.48	
Parti Québécois	Judith Cardin	8,978	23.83	
Conservative	Alexandre Arrata	5,009	13.29	
Coalition Avenir Québec	Christopher Skeete	4,836	12.83	
Québec solidaire	Karine Cliche	4,368	11.59	
Green	Mustapha Jaalouk	224	0.59	
Climat Québec	Anne-Marie Tougas	145	0.38	
Total valid votes				
Total rejected ballots				
Turnout			65.55	
Electors on the lists			–	–
Liberal gain from Coalition Avenir Québec		Swing		+
Source: Élections Québec

2022 Quebec general election: Sainte-Rose
Party	Candidate	Votes	%	±%
Coalition Avenir Québec	Christopher Skeete	14,091	38.50	+1.66
Liberal	Michel Trottier	8,778	23.98	–6.14
Québec solidaire	Karine Cliche	5,243	14.33	+0.45
Parti Québécois	Lyne Jubinville	4,536	12.39	–2.11
Conservative	Stéphanie Beauchamp	3,429	9.37	+8.21
Green	Pierrette Kamning Nguendjong	304	0.83	–1.69
Climat Québec	Simon Filiatrault	128	0.35	–
Parti 51	Kevin Fortin	91	0.25	–
Total valid votes		36,600	98.68	+0.15
Total rejected ballots		490	1.32	–0.15
Turnout		37,090	67.56	–2.45
Electors on the lists		54,902	–	–

2018 Quebec general election: Sainte-Rose
Party	Candidate	Votes	%	±%
Coalition Avenir Québec	Christopher Skeete	13,491	36.84	+12.79
Liberal	Jean Habel	11,029	30.12	-12.08
Parti Québécois	Marc-André Constantin	5,309	14.50	-12.79
Québec solidaire	Simon Charron	5,082	13.88	+8.10
Green	Caroline Bergevin	923	2.52	
Conservative	Benoit Blanchard	423	1.16	
New Democratic	Alain Giguère	250	0.68	
CINQ	Valérie Louis-Charles	110	0.30	
Total valid votes		36,617	98.53	
Total rejected ballots		546	1.47	
Turnout		37,163	70.01	
Eligible voters		53,080		
Coalition Avenir Québec gain from Liberal		Swing		+12.44
Source(s) "Rapport des résultats officiels du scrutin". Élections Québec.

2014 Quebec general election
Party	Candidate	Votes	%	±%
Liberal	Gilles Ouimet	20,614	55.14	+17.64
Parti Québécois	François-Gycelain Rocque	7,798	20.86	-7.11
Coalition Avenir Québec	Christopher Skeete	6,667	17.83	-9.94
Québec solidaire	Marie-Claire Des Rochers-Lamarche	2,122	5.68	+2.13
Option nationale	Bernard Paré	181	0.48	-0.61
Total valid votes		37,382	100.00	–
Total rejected ballots		440	1.16	–
Turnout		37,822	77.23	
Electors on the lists		48,972	–	–
Liberal hold		Swing		

2012 Quebec general election
Party	Candidate	Votes	%	±%
Liberal	Jean Rousselle	12,973	37.48	-10.87
Parti Québécois	Linda Tousignant	10,564	30.52	-4.57
Coalition Avenir Québec	Christopher Skeete	8,544	24.68	+13.17
Québec solidaire	David Lanneville	1,373	3.97	+0.17
Option nationale	Catherine Houbart	688	1.99	–
Independent	Jean-Marc Boyer	253	0.73	–
Conservative	Alain Robert	219	0.63	–
Total valid votes		34,614	98.88	–
Total rejected ballots		393	1.12	–
Turnout		35,007	79.34	–
Electors on the lists		44,122	–	–
Liberal hold		Swing		-3.15
