= Rivière aux Saumons (Massawippi River tributary) =

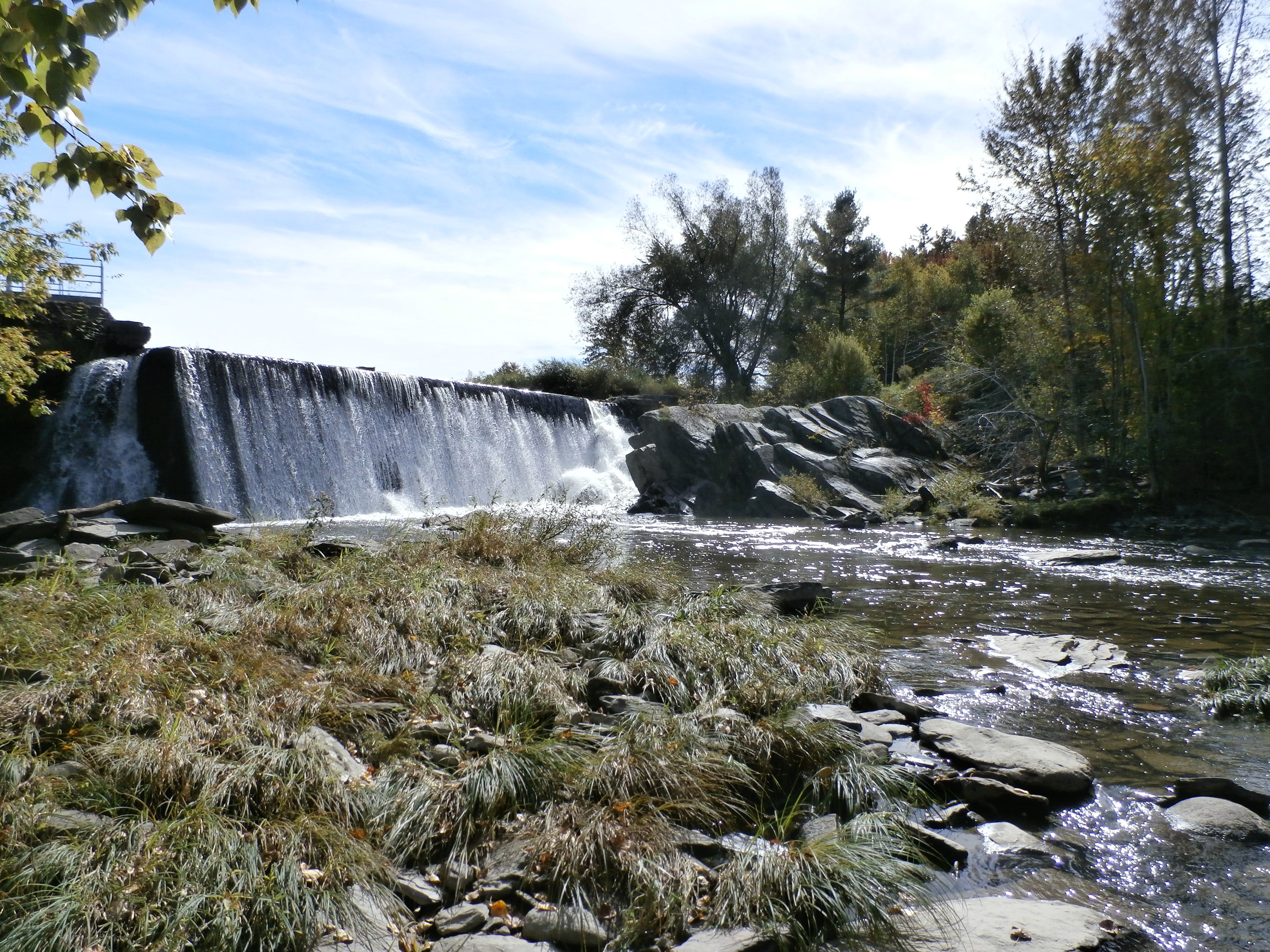
- Rivière aux Saumons (Massawippi) in Martinville

Location
- Country: Canada
- Province: Quebec
- Region: Estrie
- City: Sherbrooke

Physical characteristics
- Source: Lake Lindsay
  - location: Coaticook
  - coordinates: 45°10′54″N 71°33′38″W
  - elevation: 373 m (1,224 ft)
- Mouth: Massawippi River
  - location: Sherbrooke
  - coordinates: 45°21′08″N 71°51′35″W
  - elevation: 145 m (476 ft)
- Length: 70.6 km (43.9 mi)

Basin features
- Progression: Massawippi River, Saint-François River, Saint Lawrence River
- Tributaries
  - left: (upstream) Tang stream, Moe River.
  - right: (upstream) Proulx brook, Racey brook, Boivin-Saint-Laurent brook, Rabouin brook, Bobines brook, Chaloux brook.

The Rivière aux Saumons is a tributary of the Massawippi River which flows into the Saint-François River, a sub-tributary of the St. Lawrence River. It flows through the municipalities of Sainte-Edwidge-de-Clifton, Martinville, Compton, Cookshire-Eaton, Lennoxville, from Sherbrooke, Quebec, Canada.

Forestry and agriculture are the main economic activities in this valley.

The surface of the Rivière aux Saumons is usually frozen from mid-December to mid-March, except the rapids; however, safe circulation on the ice is generally from late December to early March.

== Geography ==
The main hydrographic slopes of the "rivière aux Saumons" are:

- north side: Massawippi River;
- East Coast:
- south side: Moe River, Coaticook River;
- Western coast:

The "rivière aux Saumons" rises at Lindsay Lake (length: 2.3 km (1.4 mi); altitude: 373 m (1,224 ft)), in the Charrington sector, in the municipality of Coaticook. This lake receives the waters of Madore stream (coming from the north) and Moreau stream (coming from the northeast). From its source, the course of the Rivière aux Saumons descends on 70.6 km (43.9 mi), with a drop in level of 228 m (748 ft).

Upper course of the river (segment of 39.3 km (24.4 mi))

From Lac Lindsay, the "Rivière aux Saumons" flows on:

- 10.2 km (6.3 mi) westwards, to the limit of the municipality of Sainte-Edwidge-de-Clifton;
- 5.6 km (3.5 mi) westward to the bridge at route 251;
- 3.5 km (2.2 mi) north-west, up to the confluence of the Bobines stream;
- 2.6 km (1.6 mi) north-west, up to the Gosselin-Mills bridge;
- 9.1 km (5.7 mi) north-west, up to the limit of the municipality of Martinville;
- 8.3 km (5.2 mi) north, to the bridge of route 208, located on the west side of the village of Martinville.

Lower river (segment of 31.3 km (19.4 mi))

From the village bridge of Martinville, the "Rivière aux Saumons" flows over:

- 3.8 km (2.4 mi) north-west, up to the route 251 bridge;
- 5.6 km (3.5 mi) north-west, up to the road bridge located at the boundary of the municipalities of Compton and Cookshire-Eaton;
- 3.7 km (2.3 mi) northerly, to the bridge of a road situated to the south-west of the village of Cookshire-Eaton (sector: Johnville);
- 9.6 km (6.0 mi) westwards, to the confluence of the Moe River;
- 5.7 km (3.5 mi) north-west to the bridge of the hamlet of Huntingville;
- 2.9 km (1.8 mi) north to its mouth.

The mouth of the "Rivière aux Saumons" flows onto the south-eastern bank of the Massawippi River. The mouth is located south of Lennoxville, 2.9 km (1.8 mi) upstream of the mouth of the Massawippi River.

== Toponymy ==
The toponym "rivière aux Saumons" was formalized on October 6, 1983, at the Commission de toponymie du Québec.

== See also ==
- Saint-François River, a stream
- Moe River, a stream
- Sherbrooke, a city
- Sainte-Edwidge-de-Clifton, a municipality
- Martinville, a municipality
- Compton, a municipality
- Cookshire-Eaton, a municipality
- List of rivers of Quebec
