= Marie Claude Fournier =

Marie Claude Fournier MNA

Member of the National Assembly for Fabre
- Incumbent
- Assumed office October 5, 2026
- Preceded by: Alice Abou-Khalil

Personal details
- Party: Liberal

Marie Claude Fournier is a Canadian politician who is a candidate for the National Assembly of Quebec for Fabre in the 2026 Quebec general election as a member of the Quebec Liberal Party.

== Electoral record ==
2026 Quebec general election: Fabre
** Preliminary results — Not yet official **
Party	Candidate	Votes	%	±%
Liberal	Marie Claude Fournier	15,043	42.74	+11.79
Parti Québécois	Catherine Dansereau-Redhead	6,968	19.80	+10.05
Conservative	Stéphane Turmel	6,080	17.27	+2.13
Québec solidaire	Josée Chevalier	3,439	9.77	–1.33
Coalition Avenir Québec	Lucie Létourneau	3,118	8.86	–22.91
Green	Lynn Buchanan	313	0.89	–0.32
Canadian	Qaiser Choudhry	237	0.67	N/A
Total valid votes		35,198	98.78	–0.10
Total rejected ballots		436	1.22	+0.10
Turnout		35,634	60.73	–1.82
Electors on the lists		58,674		
Liberal gain from Coalition Avenir Québec		Swing		+0.87
Source: Élections Québec
