= Saint-Venant-de-Paquette =

- Municipality
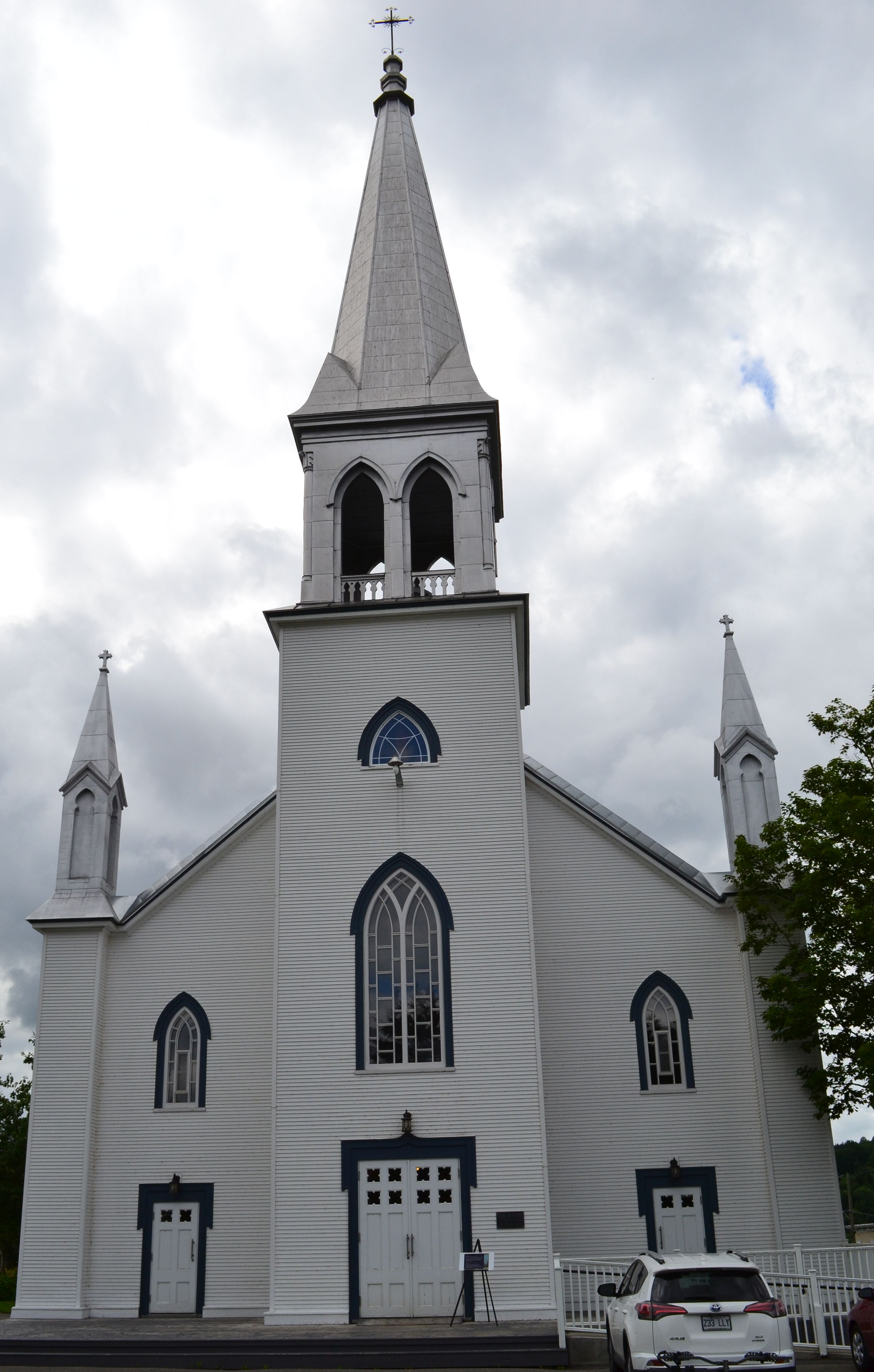
- Saint-Venant-de-Paquette Church

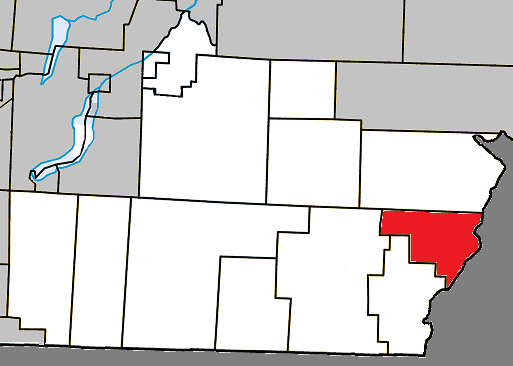
- Location within Coaticook RCM

- Location within Southern Quebec
- Coordinates: 45°08′N 71°28′W
- Country: Canada
- Province: Quebec
- Region: Estrie
- RCM: Coaticook
- Constituted: June 11, 1917

Government
  - Mayor: Henri Pariseau
  - Federal riding: Compton—Stanstead
  - Prov. riding: Saint-François

Area
  - Total: 58.60 km^{2} (22.63 sq mi)
  - Land: 58.75 km^{2} (22.68 sq mi)
- There is an apparent contradiction between two authoritative sources

Population (2021)
  - Total: 69
  - Density: 1.2/km^{2} (3.1/sq mi)
  - Pop 2016-2021: ▼28.9%
  - Dwellings: 61
- Time zone: UTC−5 (EST)
  - Summer (DST): UTC−4 (EDT)
- Postal code(s): J0B 1S0
- Area code: 819
- Highways: R-253
- Website: municipalites-du-quebec.org/st-venant-de-paquette

Saint-Venant-de-Paquette (French pronunciation: [sɛ̃ vənɑ̃ də pakɛt]) is a municipality in Quebec, Canada. The village, founded in 1862, is situated north of East-Hereford, south of St. Malo, and east of Coaticook.

== Demographics ==
=== Population ===
Population trend:

Census	Population	Change (%)
2021	69	▼28.9%
2016	97	▼6.7%
2011	104	▼6.3%
2006	111	▼4.5%
2001	116	▲4.5%
1996	111	▲1.8%
1991	109	N/A

There are about 70 residents; however, the exact number is not available. The municipality is unable to provide an exact figure because many of the homes are used as cottages or as second homes.

== Les Amis du Patrimoine ==
Since 1993, a committee called Les Amis du Patrimoine was organized in order to promote and organize cultural and artistic activities in the village. Some of these activities have funded, in part, the maintenance and renovation of the church. Further, Les Amis du Patrimoine have added, to their list of responsibilities, the opening of a small boutique called the "Tree House", and, have created a nature-path called the "Poetic Trail". Les Amis du Patrimoine in Saint-Venant-de-Paquette is a non-profit organization that depends mainly on the voluntary involvement of its citizens and from elsewhere.
