= Geneviève Hébert =

Canadian politician

Member of the National Assembly of Quebec for Saint-François
- In office October 1, 2018 – October 5, 2026
- Preceded by: Guy Hardy
- Succeeded by: Sylvie Tanguay

Personal details
- Born: 1973 (age 52–53) Fleurimont (Sherbrooke), Quebec, Canada
- Party: Coalition Avenir Québec

Geneviève Hébert (born 1973) is a Canadian politician, who was elected to the National Assembly of Quebec in the 2018 provincial election. She represented the electoral district of Saint-François as a member of the Coalition Avenir Québec until 2026.

== Electoral record ==
2026 Quebec general election: Saint-François
** Preliminary results — Not yet official **
Party	Candidate	Votes	%	±%
Parti Québécois	Sylvie Tanguay	9,709	26.03	
Liberal	Jacqueline Belleau	8,900	23.86	
Conservative	Esteban Méndez-Hord	6,611	17.73	
Coalition Avenir Québec	Geneviève Hébert	6,217	16.67	
Québec solidaire	Mia Fréchette	5,416	14.52	
Climat Québec	Rémi Tétreault	271	0.73	
Présence	Sylvie Peloquin	170	0.46	
Total valid votes				
Total rejected ballots				
Turnout			68.67	
Electors on the lists			–	–
Parti Québécois gain from Coalition Avenir Québec		Swing		+
Source: Élections Québec

2022 Quebec general election: Saint-François
Party	Candidate	Votes	%	±%
Coalition Avenir Québec	Geneviève Hébert	17,280	42.43	+7.70
Québec solidaire	Mélissa Généreux	11,491	28.21	+5.53
Conservative	Dany Bernier	4,483	11.01	–
Parti Québécois	Sylvie Tanguay	3,712	9.11	-7.08
Liberal	Claude Charron	3,220	7.91	-15.39
Canadian	Colleen McInerney	285	0.70	–
Climat Québec	Olivier Dion	257	0.63	–
Total valid votes		40,728	98.63	–
Total rejected ballots		566	1.37	–
Turnout		41,294	69.45	
Electors on the lists		59,460		

2018 Quebec general election: Saint-François
Party	Candidate	Votes	%	±%
Coalition Avenir Québec	Geneviève Hébert	13,524	34.73	+17.64
Liberal	Charles Poulin	9,074	23.30	-15.23
Québec solidaire	Kévin Côté	8,833	22.68	+14.57
Parti Québécois	Solange Masson	6,304	16.19	-16.72
Green	Mathieu Morin	691	1.77	+0.53
Citoyens au pouvoir	Cyrille Mc Elreavy	514	1.32	
Total valid votes		38,940	98.29	
Total rejected ballots		677	1.71	
Turnout		39,617	69.15	
Eligible voters		57,290		
Coalition Avenir Québec gain from Liberal		Swing		+16.44
Source(s) "Rapport des résultats officiels du scrutin". Élections Québec.
