= List of third party leaders of Quebec =

This is a list of politicians who served as third party parliamentary leaders (chefs parlementaires) at the National Assembly of Quebec. Parties with fewer than twelve Members of the National Assembly (MNA) 12 members and less than 20% of the vote do not have official party status and their members sit as Independents.

== Third party leaders with party status ==
Parliamentary Leader	District (Region)	Took office	Left office	Party
Paul Gouin	L'Assomption (Lanaudière)	1935	1936	Action libérale nationale
Camille Laurin	Bourget (Montreal East)	1970	1973	Parti Québécois
Camil Samson	Rouyn-Noranda (Abitibi-Témiscamingue)	1970	1972	Ralliement créditiste du Québec
Armand Bois	Saint-Sauveur (Québec)	1972	1973	Ralliement créditiste du Québec
Camil Samson	Rouyn-Noranda (Abitibi-Témiscamingue)	1973	1973	Ralliement créditiste du Québec
Rodrigue Biron	Lotbinière (Chaudière-Appalaches)	1976	1980	Union Nationale
Michel Le Moignan	Gaspé (Gaspésie–Îles-de-la-Madeleine)	1980	1981	Union Nationale
André Boisclair	Pointe-aux-Trembles (Montreal East)	2007	2007	Parti Québécois
François Gendron	Abitibi-Ouest (Abitibi-Témiscamingue)	2007	2007	Parti Québécois
Pauline Marois	Charlevoix (Québec)	2007	2008	Parti Québécois
Sylvie Roy	Lotbinière (Chaudière-Appalaches)	2009	2009	Action démocratique du Québec
François Bonnardel	Shefford (Montérégie)	2009	2009	Action démocratique du Québec
Gérard Deltell	Chauveau (Capitale-Nationale)	2009	2012	Action démocratique du Québec
François Legault	L'Assomption (Lanaudière)	2012	2018	Coalition Avenir Québec
Manon Massé	Sainte-Marie–Saint-Jacques (Montreal)	2018	2021	Québec solidaire
Gabriel Nadeau-Dubois	Gouin (Montreal)	2021	2025	Québec solidaire
Ruba Ghazal	Mercier (Montreal)	2025	2026	Québec solidaire
Éric Duhaime	Bellechasse (Chaudière-Appalaches)	2026	present	Conservative Party of Québec

== Third party leaders without party status ==
Parliamentary Leader	District	Took office	Left office	Party
Henri Bourassa	Saint-Hyacinthe (Montérégie)	1908	1912	Ligue nationaliste
André Laurendeau	Montréal-Laurier (Montreal East)	1944	1947	Bloc Populaire Canadien
David Côté	Rouyn-Noranda–Témiscamingue (Abitibi-Témiscamingue)	1944	1945	Co-operative Commonwealth Federation
René Lévesque	Laurier (Montreal East)	1968	1970	Parti Québécois
Fabien Roy	Beauce-Sud (Chaudière-Appalaches)	1973	1975	Ralliement créditiste du Québec
Maurice Bellemare	Johnson (Eastern Townships)	1974	1976	Union Nationale
Robert Libman	D'Arcy-McGee (Montreal West)	1989	1993	Equality Party
Mario Dumont	Rivière-du-Loup (Bas-Saint-Laurent)	1994	2007	Action démocratique du Québec
Mario Dumont	Rivière-du-Loup (Bas-Saint-Laurent)	2008	2009	Action démocratique du Québec
Amir Khadir	Mercier (Montreal East)	2008	2012	Québec solidaire
Gérard Deltell	Chauveau (Capitale-Nationale)	2012	2012	Coalition Avenir Québec
Francoise David	Gouin (Montreal)	2012	2017	Québec solidaire
Manon Massé	Sainte-Marie–Saint-Jacques (Montreal)	2017	2018	Québec solidaire

== See also ==
- List of Quebec general elections
- Timeline of Quebec history
- National Assembly of Quebec
- List of premiers of Quebec
- Deputy Premier of Quebec
- List of leaders of the Official Opposition (Quebec)
- History of Quebec
