= Jacques-Yvan Morin =

Canadian law professor and politician (1931–2023)

Jacques-Yvan Morin GOQ
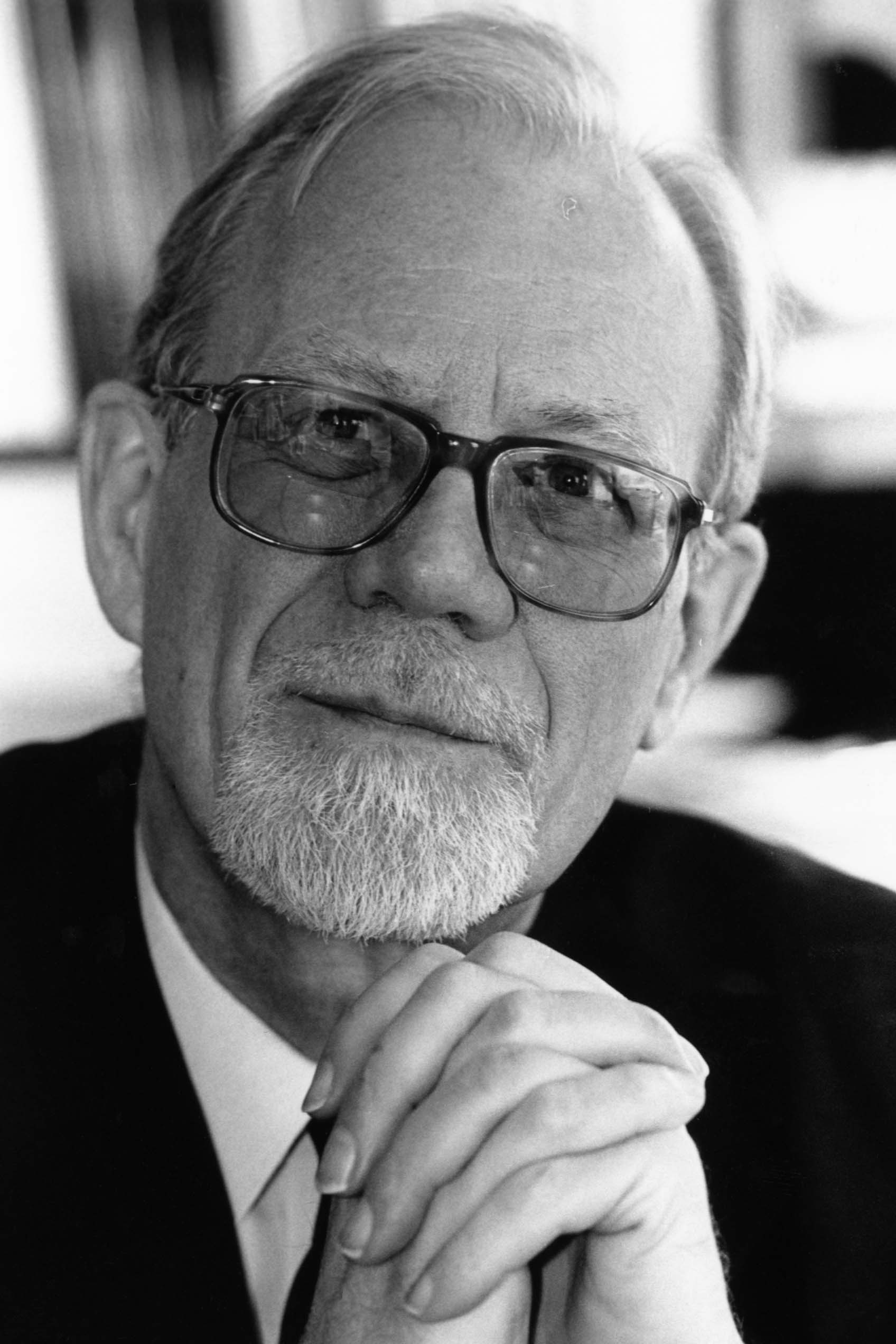
- Morin in 1995

Deputy Premier of Quebec
- In office November 25, 1976 – March 5, 1984
- Premier: René Lévesque
- Preceded by: Gérard D. Levesque
- Succeeded by: Camille Laurin

Member of the National Assembly of Quebec for Sauvé
- In office 1973–1984
- Preceded by: Electoral district established
- Succeeded by: Marcel Parent

Personal details
- Born: July 15, 1931 Quebec City, Quebec, Canada
- Died: July 26, 2023 (aged 92)
- Occupation: Law professor, politician

Jacques-Yvan Morin GOQ (July 15, 1931 – July 26, 2023) was a Canadian law professor and politician in Quebec. Morin graduated from the McGill University Faculty of Law with a BCL in 1953, where he was the founder of the McGill Law Journal. He taught international and constitutional law at Université de Montréal from 1958 until 1973. He was deputy director of the Canadian Yearbook of International Law from 1963 to 1973 and founded the Quebec Journal of International Law in 1984.

== Career ==
From 1966 to 1969, Morin chaired the Estates General of French Canada and joined in 1970 the Quebec sovereignty movement. He became president of the Mouvement national des Québécoises et des Québécois in 1971. He failed to win a seat in Bourassa in the 1970 Quebec provincial election but won a seat in the riding of Sauvé in the 1973 election. After the latter election the Parti québécois became the official opposition since the former opposition party, the Union Nationale, had failed to win any seats. Since the party leader, René Lévesque, had not won a seat in the 1973 election, Morin became leader of the Opposition in the National Assembly until the 1976 election, which the Parti québécois won. As a member of Lévesque's government, Morin was appointed successively minister of education (1976–1981), cultural and scientific development (1981–1982) and intergovernmental affairs (1982–1984). During those years, he also served as deputy premier of Quebec.

Morin returned to teaching in 1984 at Université de Montréal, where he became professor emeritus in 1997.

== Honors ==
In 2001, Morin was made a Grand Officer of the National Order of Quebec. Other honours include the Rights and Freedoms Prize of the Commission on Human Rights in Quebec (2000), as well as the Prix René-Chaloult of the Association of Former Parliamentarians (2011).

== Death ==
Morin died on July 26, 2023, at the age of 92.

== See also ==
- Politics of Quebec
- Quebec general elections
- List of Quebec leaders of the Opposition
- Timeline of Quebec history

Political offices
Preceded by Gérard D. Levesque	Deputy Premier of Quebec; 1976–1984	Succeeded by Camille Laurin
Preceded by Gabriel Loubier	Leader of the Opposition in Quebec; 1973–1976	Succeeded by Gérard D. Levesque
