= Paul-Émile Sauvageau =

Canadian politician (1918–2003)

Member of the National Assembly of Quebec for Bourget
- In office 1966–1970
- Preceded by: Jean Meunier
- Succeeded by: Camille Laurin

Personal details
- Born: September 29, 1918 Montreal, Quebec
- Died: September 12, 2003 (aged 84) Montreal, Quebec
- Party: Union Nationale

Paul-Émile Sauvageau (September 29, 1918 – September 12, 2003) was a Canadian politician. He was a Member of the Legislative Assembly of Quebec and a City Councillor in Montreal, Quebec.

== Background ==
He was born in Montreal on September 29, 1918, and owned a car dealership.

== City Councillor ==
Sauvageau was elected to the City Council in 1957. He was re-elected in 1960 and 1962. He did not run for re-election in 1966. He was a member of the Civic Party of Montreal and represented the district of Mercier. From 1962 to 1966 he was his party's House Whip and also served as Mayor Pro Tempore in 1963.

== Member of the legislature ==
He successfully ran as a Union Nationale candidate in the district of Bourget in the 1966 provincial election. He lost his bid for re-election in the 1970 provincial election against Parti Québécois candidate Camille Laurin.

He also ran as a Ralliement créditiste du Québec candidate in the 1973 provincial election, but lost again.

== Death ==
Sauvageau died on September 12, 2003.
