= Bernard Landry =

Premier of Quebec from 2001 to 2003

Bernard Landry GOQ
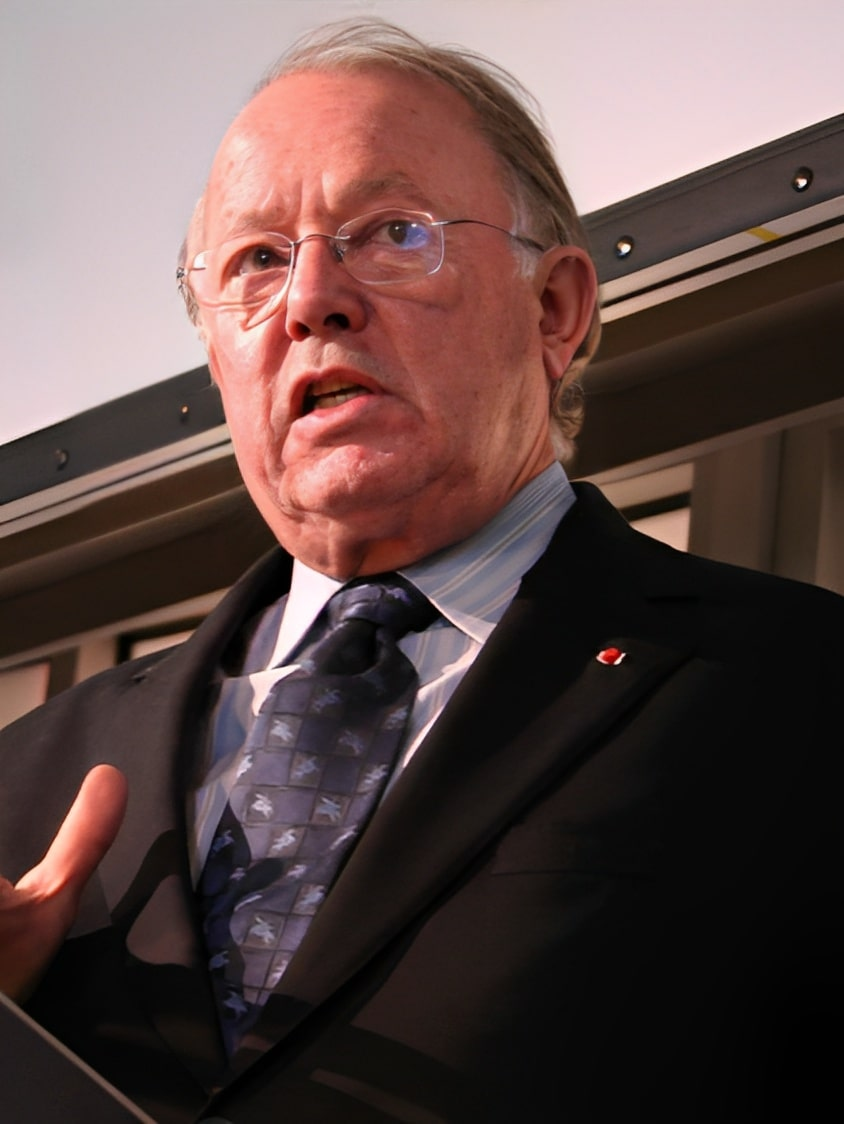
- Landry in 2006

28th Premier of Quebec
- In office March 8, 2001 – April 29, 2003
- Monarch: Elizabeth II
- Lieutenant Governor: Lise Thibault
- Deputy: Pauline Marois
- Preceded by: Lucien Bouchard
- Succeeded by: Jean Charest

Deputy Premier of Quebec
- In office September 26, 1994 – March 8, 2001
- Premier: Jacques Parizeau; Lucien Bouchard
- Preceded by: Monique Gagnon-Tremblay
- Succeeded by: Pauline Marois

Leader of the Opposition of Quebec
- In office June 6, 2003 – June 6, 2005
- Preceded by: Jean Charest
- Succeeded by: Louise Harel

President of the Parti Québécois
- In office March 2, 2001 – June 6, 2005
- Preceded by: Lucien Bouchard
- Succeeded by: Louise Harel (interim)
Quebec Executive Council
Minister of Economic Affairs and Finance
In office January 29, 1996 – March 8, 2001
Premier	Lucien Bouchard
Preceded by	Pauline Marois (Finance)
Succeeded by	Pauline Marois
Minister of International Affairs (Note: Office known as "Minister of International Affairs, Immigration and Cultural Communities" from September 1994 to November 1995.)
In office September 26, 1994 – January 29, 1996
Premier	Jacques Parizeau
Preceded by	John Ciaccia
Succeeded by	Sylvain Simard
Minister of Finance
In office October 16, 1985 – December 12, 1985
Premier	Pierre-Marc Johnson
Preceded by	Yves Duhaime
Succeeded by	Gérard D. Levesque
Parliamentary constituencies
Member of the National Assembly of Quebec
In office September 12, 1994 – June 4, 2005
Preceded by	Luce Dupuis
Succeeded by	Stéphane Bergeron
Constituency	Verchères
In office April 13, 1981 – December 2, 1985
Preceded by	Riding established
Succeeded by	Guy Bélanger
Constituency	Laval-des-Rapides
In office November 15, 1976 – April 13, 1981
Preceded by	Gilles Houde
Succeeded by	Michel Leduc
Constituency	Fabre

Personal details
- Born: March 9, 1937 Saint-Jacques, Quebec, Canada
- Died: November 6, 2018 (aged 81) Verchères, Quebec, Canada
- Party: Parti Québécois
- Spouses: Lorraine Laporte (died 1999) Chantal Renaud (m. 2004)
- Education: Université de Montréal; Paris Institute of Political Studies
- Profession: Lawyer; economist; professor

Bernard Landry GOQ (French: [bɛʁnɑʁ lɑ̃dʁi]; March 9, 1937 – November 6, 2018) was a Canadian politician who served as the 28th premier of Quebec from 2001 to 2003. A member of the Parti Québécois (PQ), he led the party from 2001 to 2005, also serving as the leader of the Opposition from 2003 to 2005.

== Personal life ==
Landry was born on March 9, 1937, in Saint-Jacques, Quebec, (near Joliette), the son of Thérèse Granger and Bernard Landry. Landry was first married to Lorraine Laporte first a lawyer and later a court judge on Quebec justice system with whom he had three children. After his wife's death to cancer in 1999, in 2004, he married script writer and former yé-yé singer and actress Chantal Renaud.

Landry was classically trained by the clergy and retained some Latin. A native speaker of French, he also spoke fluent English and Spanish.

Landry received a degree in law from the Université de Montréal, and a degree in economics and finance from Sciences Po Paris. While at the Université de Montréal, he had a small acting role in Denis Héroux's student film Over My Head (Jusqu'au cou).

From September 2005, he was a professor at UQAM in the business strategy department.

On February 9, 2008, Landry hosted the final round of the Finance Quiz at the 2008 Financial Open at UQAM.

Landry died on November 6, 2018, from complications of pulmonary fibrosis at the age of 81. He was given a state funeral at Basilique Notre-Dame de Montréal.

== Politics ==
Landry ran unsuccessfully in Joliette in the 1970 election and in Joliette-Montcalm in 1973. He was a practising lawyer and a partner in the Montreal law firm of Lapointe Rosenstein when he was elected to the National Assembly of Quebec in the 1976 general election in Fabre. Under the Parti Québécois government of René Lévesque, he served as Minister of State of Economic Development from February 2, 1977, to March 12, 1981. Re-elected in the riding of Laval-des-rapides at the 1981 general election, he was again Minister of State of Economic Development until September 9, 1982, when he was made Delegate Minister to Exterior Commerce. He was later Minister of International Relations and Exterior Commerce, and Minister of Finance in the same government.

During the 1988 Canadian federal election, Landry backed the Free Trade Agreement. His support, along with Jacques Parizeau played a role in Brian Mulroney's dominance in Quebec during the election.

After the defeat of Parti Québécois in the 1985 general election, he taught in the Department of Administrative Sciences at the Université du Québec à Montréal until 1994. After the victory of the PQ in the 1994 general election, the newly elected Premier, Jacques Parizeau, made him his Deputy Premier, a position he held from September 26, 1994, to December 15, 1998.

As finance minister, Landry reduced program expenditures to balance the budget. The PQ and sovereignty lost public support and has not been restored to previous levels since.

It was reported in the Montreal Gazette, and picked up by the New York Times, that Landry spoke disparagingly of immigrants on the night of the 1995 referendum. In an unconfirmed article by The Gazette, an English-language paper in Montreal, it was reported that two employees at the Inter-Continental hotel in the city planned to file a complaint against Mr. Landry with the Quebec Human Rights Commission. Anita Martinez, a night clerk at the hotel, said that Mr. Landry told her, "It was because of you immigrants that the 'no' won," and added, "Why is it that we open the doors to this country so you can vote 'no' " to Quebec sovereignty?. Landry himself firmly denied having ever been either impolite to the two women, nor having ever made the comments regarding immigrants.

Landry became Premier of Quebec on March 8, 2001, following the resignation of Lucien Bouchard. He was a Quebec sovereigntist advocating a supranational confederation of Quebec and Canada, inspired by the institutions of the European Union. As such, he was one of the most faithful followers of René Lévesque and the other sovereignty-associationists.

In 2001, Landry was critical about Quebec receiving an extra $1.5 billion in equalization payments calling it degrading Quebec status and accused Ottawa for short-changing the province for decades by stating "Receiving equalization payments for more than 40 years in a row is clear evidence that the central government failed in redistributing real wealth,".

During the Parti Québécois leadership race of 2001, Landry criticized the federal government's policy of prominently displaying the maple leaf on federal government buildings and programs by saying, "Le Québec ne ferait pas le trottoir pour un bout de chiffon rouge" (Quebec does not prostitute itself for a piece of red cloth). Landry's aggressive remarks were widely criticized for insulting the Canadian flag, particularly among English-language media which rendered chiffon as "rag". Landry subsequently apologized but insisted that his words had been mistranslated. Landry's opponents used the controversy to undermine his national political cachet.

In 2003, Landry lost the Quebec general election to Jean Charest's Quebec Liberal Party. A renowned documentary named À hauteur d'homme about his viewpoint of the election was produced in 2003. At the August 2004 Parti Québécois National Council, after a long period of reflection that began the day after the election, he announced on August 27, 2004, that he would remain president of the party, and lead the PQ to the next election in order to bring Quebec to independence. However, on June 4, 2005, Landry announced he would resign as party leader after gaining 76.2% approval in a leadership confidence vote at a party convention in Quebec City, which he did not consider sufficient support.

After retirement, Landry stayed active in politics as a critic and to encourage young people to be involved in politics.

== Works ==
- Quebec's Foreign Trade, 1982
- Preface of Price Waterhouse's Les 58 moyens d'exporter, 1985
- Commerce sans frontières : le sens du libre-échange, 1987
- Preface of Zeina El Tibi's La Francophonie et le dialogue des cultures, 2001
- La cause du Québec, 2002
- Le commerce international : une approche nord-américaine, 2008 (in collab. with Antoine Panet-Raymond and Denis Robichaud)

Articles

- "La mondialisation rend la souveraineté plus nécessaire et urgente que jamais", in L'Action nationale, March 1999 (en, fr)
- "Pour l'indépendance politique et pétrolière", in Le Devoir, June 13, 2008 (en, fr)

== Honours ==
- 1999 - Bavarian Order of Merit
- Legion d'honneur
- 2006 - Saint-Jean-Baptiste Society's Patriot of the Year and Bene merenti de patria medal
- 2008 - Grand Officer of the National Order of Quebec

== See also ==
- 1985 Parti Québécois leadership election
- Politics of Quebec
- List of Quebec leaders of the Opposition
- Quebec general elections
- Timeline of Quebec history
- Ted Moses (Former Grand Chief of the Cree)

== Notes ==
Government offices
Preceded by Yves Duhaime	Minister of Finance (Quebec); 1985	Succeeded by Gérard D. Levesque
Preceded by Pauline Marois	Minister of Finance (Quebec); 1996–2001	Succeeded by Pauline Marois
