= Réjean Hébert =

Canadian politician and geriatrician

Réjean Hébert OC
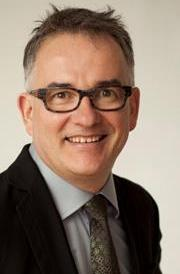

Ministry of Health and Social Services
- In office September 19, 2012 – April 23, 2014
- Premier: Pauline Marois
- Preceded by: Yves Bolduc
- Succeeded by: Gaétan Barrette

Member of the National Assembly of Quebec for Saint-François
- In office September 4, 2012 – April 7, 2014
- Preceded by: Monique Gagnon-Tremblay
- Succeeded by: Guy Hardy

Personal details
- Born: September 7, 1955 (age 71) Quebec City, Quebec
- Party: Liberal (since 2019)
- Other political affiliations: Parti Québécois (before 2019)
- Profession: Physician

Réjean Hébert OC is a Canadian politician and geriatrician. He was a member of the National Assembly of Quebec for the riding of Saint-François, first elected in the 2012 election, he served as Minister of Health and Social Services in the government of Pauline Marois.

His narrow victory over Quebec Liberal Party candidate Nathalie Goguen was confirmed in a judicial recount on September 14, 2012. He was defeated in the 2014 Quebec election by Liberal candidate Guy Hardy.

Hebert was dean of the School of Public Health at the Universite de Montreal.

In September 2019, Hébert was confirmed as the federal Liberal Party of Canada candidate in the Longueuil—Saint-Hubert electoral district. He won the nomination by acclamation, but did not win the election.

Hébert was married and had children before coming out as gay at age 40. He was one of three openly gay members of the National Assembly during his time in office, alongside Sylvain Gaudreault and Agnès Maltais.

He was appointed as an Officer of the Order of Canada in 2023. He currently resides in Sherbrooke, Quebec.

== Electoral record ==
=== Federal ===
2019 Canadian federal election: Longueuil—Saint-Hubert
| Party | Candidate | Votes | % | ±% | Expenditures |
|---|---|---|---|---|---|
| Bloc Québécois | Denis Trudel | 23,061 | 38.5 | +11.23 | $46,039.85 |
| Liberal | Réjean Hébert | 20,471 | 34.2 | +4.19 | $77,307.46 |
| Green | Pierre Nantel | 6,745 | 11.3 | +8.81 | $16,474.78 |
| New Democratic | Éric Ferland | 5,104 | 8.5 | –22.72 | $11,119.46 |
| Conservative | Patrick Clune | 3,779 | 6.3 | –2.44 | none listed |
| People's | Ellen Comeau | 467 | 0.8 | – | $0.00 |
| Independent | Pierre-Luc Fillon | 217 | 0.4 | – | $0.00 |
| Total valid votes/expense limit | | 59,844 | 100.0 | | |
| Total rejected ballots | | 1,086 | | | |
| Turnout | | 60,930 | 69.9 | | |
| Eligible voters | | 87,113 | | | |
| Bloc Québécois gain from Independent | | Swing | | – | |
Source: Elections Canada
Note: Pierre Nantel was the incumbent MP who was elected in 2015 as a New Democrat, but sat as an independent after August 16, 2019. Nantel decided to run again as the Green candidate in the 2019 election, but never joined the Green caucus while the 42nd Parliament was in session.

=== Provincial ===
2014 Quebec general election
| Party | Candidate | Votes | % |
|---|---|---|---|
| Liberal | Guy Hardy | 14,899 | 38.53 |
| Parti Québécois | Réjean Hébert | 12,725 | 32.91 |
| Coalition Avenir Québec | Gaston Stratford | 6,607 | 17.09 |
| Québec solidaire | André Poulin | 3,136 | 8.11 |
| Green | Vincent J. Carbonneau | 478 | 1.24 |
| Bloc Pot | Philippe Lafrance | 292 | 0.76 |
| Option nationale | Étienne Boudou-Laforce | 265 | 0.69 |
| Conservative | Marcel Collette | 181 | 0.47 |
| Unité Nationale | Lionel Lambert | 82 | 0.21 |
| Total valid votes | | 38,665 | 98.52 |
| Total rejected ballots | | 581 | 1.48 |
| Turnout | | 39,246 | 70.15 |
| Electors on the lists | | 55,945 | – |

2012 Quebec general election
| Party | Candidate | Votes | % | ±% |
|---|---|---|---|---|
| Parti Québécois | Réjean Hébert | 15,303 | 36.34 | -5.70 |
| Liberal | Nathalie Goguen | 15,238 | 36.18 | -9.29 |
| Coalition Avenir Québec | Eric Giroux | 7,607 | 18.06 | +9.20 |
| Québec solidaire | André Poulin | 2,103 | 4.99 | +2.27 |
| Option nationale | Gaby Machabée | 932 | 2.21 | |
| Green | Lindsay-Jane Gowman | 809 | 1.92 | +1.64 |
| Unité Nationale | Lionel Lambert | 124 | 0.29 | |
| Total valid votes | | 42,116 | 98.64 | – |
| Total rejected ballots | | 581 | 1.36 | – |
| Turnout | | 42,697 | 77.25 | |
| Electors on the lists | | 55,274 | – | – |
| Parti Québécois gain from Liberal | | Swing | | +1.80 |

2008 Quebec general election
| Party | Candidate | Votes | % | ±% |
|---|---|---|---|---|
| Liberal | Monique Gagnon-Tremblay | 13,327 | 46.96 | +9.10 |
| Parti Québécois | Réjean Hébert | 11,845 | 41.74 | +12.16 |
| Action démocratique | Vincent Marmion | 2,230 | 7.86 | -15.99 |
| Québec solidaire | Sandy Tremblay | 769 | 2.71 | -0.65 |
| Independent | François Mailly | 210 | 0.74 | |

Political offices
| Preceded by Yves Bolduc | Minister of Health and Social Services; 2012–2014 | Succeeded by Gaétan Barrette |
