= Jean Habel =

Canadian politician (born 1988)

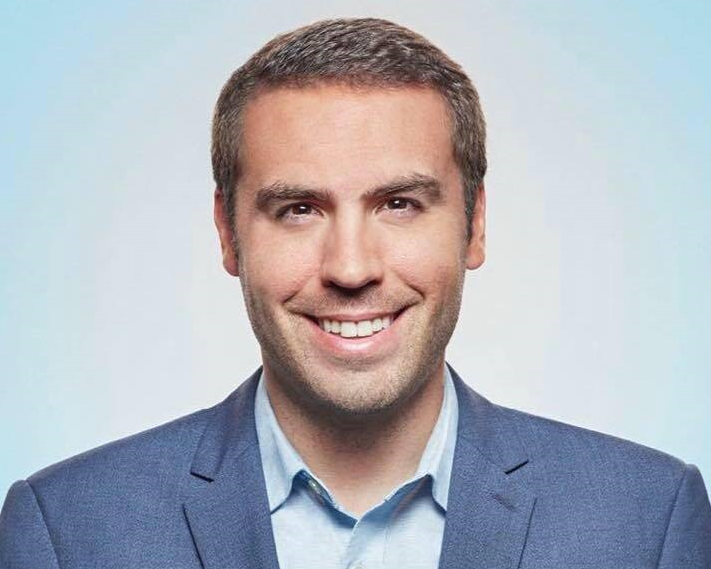

Member of the National Assembly of Quebec for Sainte-Rose
- In office April 7, 2014 – August 29, 2018
- Preceded by: Suzanne Proulx
- Succeeded by: Christopher Skeete

Personal details
- Born: January 9, 1988 (age 38) Montreal, Quebec
- Party: Quebec Liberal Party

Jean Habel (born January 9, 1988) is a Canadian politician in Quebec, who was elected to the National Assembly of Quebec in the 2014 election. He represents the electoral district of Sainte-Rose as a member of the Quebec Liberal Party.

Jean Habel is the author of the Act to amend the Act respecting the governance of state-owned enterprises to promote the presence of young people on the boards of directors of such enterprises.

He is also the co-founder of the circle of young parliamentarians of Québec. The circle of young parliamentarians of Québec is intended to give Québec's next generation of parliamentarians greater access to decision-making bodies and ensure a better representation of the population within democratic institutions.

== Parliamentary function ==
Vice-chair of the Committee on Agriculture, Fisheries, Energy and Natural Resources

Member of the:

Committee on Culture and Education

Committee on Public Finance

Committee on Health and Social Services

Committee on Transportation and the Environment

Committee on Transportation and the Environment

Office of the National Assembly

== International function ==
Vice-chair National Assembly Delegation for Relations with European Institutions

Member of the:

Québec Branch, Parliamentary Assembly of La Francophonie

National Assembly Delegation for Relations with Morocco

Québec Branch, Parliamentary Confederation of the Americas
