= Michelle Courchesne =

Canadian politician (born 1953)

Deputy Premier of Quebec
- In office May 14, 2012 – September 19, 2012
- Premier: Jean Charest
- Preceded by: Line Beauchamp
- Succeeded by: François Gendron

Member of the National Assembly of Quebec for Fabre
- In office April 14, 2003 – September 4, 2012
- Preceded by: Joseph Facal
- Succeeded by: Gilles Ouimet

Personal details
- Born: May 6, 1953 (age 72) Trois-Rivières, Quebec
- Party: Quebec Liberal Party
- Spouse: Normand Filiatreault

Michelle Courchesne (born May 6, 1953, in Trois-Rivières, Quebec) is a former Deputy Premier of Quebec. A member of the Quebec Liberal Party, she was the National Assembly Member for the riding of Fabre in Laval, Quebec. She is also the former President of the Treasury Board, Minister responsible for the Laval region, Minister of Education and Deputy Premier of Quebec. She is a former Minister of Family, Immigration, Employment and Social Solidarity.

Courchesne attended Collège Jean-de-Brébeuf before going to the Université de Montréal and obtained a bachelor's degree in sociology and a master's degree in urban development. She would become an urbanist from 1976 to 1981 before being elected to the City Council of Laval. She would also work at the Ministry of Culture and Communications as a Deputy Minister before being a member of the Board of Directors of the National Bank of Canada, Radio-Canada, the National Theater School of Canada and the Quebec Mental Health Foundation. She was then the director of the Montreal Symphony Orchestra and a vice-president for Marketel and Cognicase.

Courchesne entered politics in 2003, where she was elected as the MNA for Fabre while the Liberals regained power after nine years of governing by the Parti Québécois. She was named by Jean Charest in the Cabinet as the Minister responsible for the relations with the Citizens and Immigration and was then promoted to Employment and Social Solidarity following a Cabinet shuffle in 2005 where she took the position occupied by Claude Béchard.

Following the 2007 elections, she was re-elected in a Liberal minority government, and named the Minister of Education, Leisure and Sports as well Minister of Family.

Following the 2008 election, she kept most of the portfolios but gave up the Ministry of Family to LaFontaine MNA Tony Tomassi. Courchesne lost the Education portfolio to former Environment Minister Line Beauchamp in a 2010 cabinet shuffle and became President of the Treasury Board. She regained the Education Minister position, as well as becoming Deputy Premier of Quebec, on May 14, 2012, following Beauchamp's resignation during the ongoing student protests over tuition hikes.

She retired at the 2012 election.

== Electoral record ==
2008 Quebec general election: Fabre
Party	Candidate	Votes	%	±%
Liberal	Michelle Courchesne	15,349	45.50	
Parti Québécois	François-Gycelain Rocque	12,425	36.83	
Action démocratique	Tom Pentefountas	4,024	11.93	
Green	Erika Alvarez	1,021	3.03	–
Québec solidaire	Pierre Brien	918	2.72	
Total valid votes		33,737	100.00	
Rejected and declined votes		517		
Turnout		34,254	57.08	
Electors on the lists		60,010		
Source: Official Results, Government of Quebec

Political offices
Preceded by Line Beauchamp	Deputy Premier of Quebec; 2012	Succeeded by François Gendron
Preceded by Line Beauchamp	Minister of Education, Sport and Leisure; 2012	Succeeded by Marie Malavoy
Preceded by Jean-Marc Fournier	Minister of Education, Sport and Leisure; 2007–2010	Succeeded by Line Beauchamp
Preceded by Carole Théberge	Minister of Family; 2007–2008	Succeeded by Tony Tomassi
Preceded by Claude Béchard	Minister of Employment and Social Solidarity; 2005–2007	Succeeded by Sam Hamad
Preceded by Monique Gagnon-Tremblay	President of the Treasury Board; 2010–2012	Succeeded by Stéphane Bédard
Preceded by Dominique Vien	Minister of government services 2010–2012	Succeeded by -
