= Sylvie Tanguay =

Sylvie Tanguay MNA

Member of the National Assembly for Saint-François
- Incumbent
- Assumed office October 5, 2026
- Preceded by: Geneviève Hébert

Personal details
- Party: Parti Québécois

Sylvie Tanguay is a Canadian politician who is a candidate for the National Assembly of Quebec for Saint-François in the 2026 Quebec general election as a member of the Parti Québécois.

Tanguay is a nurse and worked at the Centre hospitalier universitaire de Sherbrooke from 2003 to 2006.

== Electoral record ==
2026 Quebec general election: Saint-François
** Preliminary results — Not yet official **
Party	Candidate	Votes	%	±%
Parti Québécois	Sylvie Tanguay	9,709	26.03	
Liberal	Jacqueline Belleau	8,900	23.86	
Conservative	Esteban Méndez-Hord	6,611	17.73	
Coalition Avenir Québec	Geneviève Hébert	6,217	16.67	
Québec solidaire	Mia Fréchette	5,416	14.52	
Climat Québec	Rémi Tétreault	271	0.73	
Présence	Sylvie Peloquin	170	0.46	
Total valid votes				
Total rejected ballots				
Turnout			68.67	
Electors on the lists			–	–
Parti Québécois gain from Coalition Avenir Québec		Swing		+
Source: Élections Québec
