= Monique Gagnon-Tremblay =

Canadian politician (born 1940)

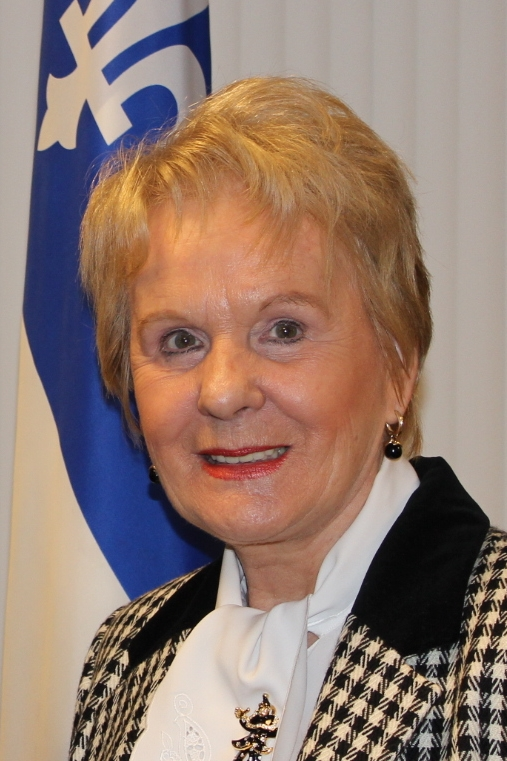
- Monique Gagnon-Tremblay in 2011

Deputy Premier of Quebec
- In office April 29, 2003 – February 18, 2005
- Premier: Jean Charest
- Preceded by: Pauline Marois
- Succeeded by: Jacques Dupuis
- In office January 11, 1994 – September 26, 1994
- Premier: Daniel Johnson Jr.
- Preceded by: Lise Bacon
- Succeeded by: Bernard Landry

Leader of the Opposition of Quebec
- In office March 2, 1998 – April 30, 1998
- Preceded by: Daniel Johnson Jr.
- Succeeded by: Jean Charest

Leader of the Quebec Liberal Party
- Interim
- In office March 2, 1998 – April 30, 1998
- Preceded by: Daniel Johnson Jr.
- Succeeded by: Jean Charest
Quebec Executive Council
Minister of International Affairs
In office August 11, 2010 – September 19, 2012
Premier	Jean Charest
Preceded by	Pierre Arcand
Succeeded by	Jean-François Lisée
In office April 29, 2003 – December 18, 2008
Premier	Jean Charest
Preceded by	Louise Beaudoin
Succeeded by	Pierre Arcand
President of the Treasury Board
In office December 18, 2008 – August 11, 2010
Premier	Jean Charest
Vice President	Yvon Marcoux
Preceded by	Monique Jérôme-Forget
Succeeded by	Michelle Courchesne
In office January 11, 1994 – September 26, 1994
Premier	Daniel Johnson Jr.
Vice President	Jean Leclerc
Preceded by	Daniel Johnson Jr.
Succeeded by	Pauline Marois
Parliamentary constituencies
Member of the Legislative Assembly of Quebec for Saint-François
In office December 2, 1985 – September 4, 2012
Preceded by	Réal Rancourt
Succeeded by	Réjean Hébert

Personal details
- Born: May 26, 1940 (age 85) Plessisville, Quebec
- Party: Quebec Liberal Party
- Cabinet: Minister of International Relations

Monique Gagnon-Tremblay (French: [mɔnik gɑɲɔ̃ tʁɑ̃ble] ; born May 26, 1940, in Plessisville, Quebec) is a politician in Quebec, Canada. She was the MNA for the riding of Saint-François in the Estrie region from 1985 to 2012. She served as Liberal leader of the Opposition in the National Assembly of Quebec from May 1998 to December 1998 and Deputy Premier in 1994 and from 2003 to 2005.

== Education and early career ==
Gagnon-Tremblay attended the Quirion Business School where she obtained a degree and added a bachelor's degree in arts at the Université Laval and a degree in law and notarial law at the Université de Sherbrooke. She became a notary in Ascot Corner and a lecturer at the Université de Sherbrooke in law. She was also a municipal councilor in Ascot Corner.

== Political career ==
=== Bourassa government ===
She was a Liberal candidate in Saint-François in 1981 but lost. She ran again in 1985 and won. She was named the Delegate Minister for the Status of Women and later the Minister of Cultural Communities and Immigration. After being re-elected in 1989, she was renamed the Minister of Cultural Communities. At the end of the mandate, when Daniel Johnson, Jr. replaced Robert Bourassa as Quebec Premier in 1993, she was named the Minister of Finances, the Deputy Premier and the President of the Treasury Board until the Liberals lost to the Parti Québécois in the 1994 elections. She was then the Caucus chair for the PLQ from 1994 to 1996

=== Interim leader and opposition party ===
When former Liberal Premier and then leader of the Opposition Daniel Johnson, Jr. decided to quit politics in March 1998, Jean Charest resigned as leader of the federal Progressive Conservative Party to replace Johnson as leader of the Quebec Liberal Party. (The Quebec Liberal Party is not affiliated with the federal Liberal Party of Canada). Gagnon-Tremblay became leader of the Opposition, since Charest did not yet have a seat in the National Assembly.

In the 1998 election, Charest won a seat and replaced Gagnon-Tremblay as leader of the Opposition. She was re-elected for fourth term and named the assistant to Charest.

=== Charest government ===
After the Liberals won the 2003 election, Gagnon-Tremblay became deputy premier from May 2003 to February 2005 in the Charest government, and has held various cabinet posts including minister of international relations as well as minister responsible for la francophonie. Re-elected in the 2007 election, she was renamed the Minister of International Relations, La Francophonie and for the Estrie Region as well as the Vice-Chair of the Treasury Board.

Following her 2008 re-election, Gagnon-Tremblay gave up for portfolio of International Relations to Pierre Arcand but was given the position of President of the Treasury Board previously occupied by Monique Jerome-Forget who was also responsible for the portfolio of finances. She was given Jerome-Forget's government administration portfolio duties until 2010. Following Jerome-Forget's retirement, Gagnon-Tremblay was given the portfolio of Infrastructures. After a 2010 Cabinet shuffle, she returned as Minister of International Relations giving the Treasury Board position to former education Minister Michelle Courchesne.

== Electoral district ==
2008 Quebec general election
Party	Candidate	Votes	%	±%
Liberal	Monique Gagnon-Tremblay	13,327	46.96	+9.10
Parti Québécois	Réjean Hébert	11,845	41.74	+12.16
Action démocratique	Vincent Marmion	2,230	7.86	-15.99
Québec solidaire	Sandy Tremblay	769	2.71	-0.65
Independent	François Mailly	210	0.74	

2007 Quebec general election
Party	Candidate	Votes	%	±%
Liberal	Monique Gagnon-Tremblay	12,528	37.86	
Parti Québécois	Mariette Fugère	9,788	29.58	
Action démocratique	François Rioux	7,892	23.85	
Green	Anick Proulx	1,772	5.35	–
Québec solidaire	Suzanne Thériault	1,111	3.36	

2003 Quebec general election
Party	Candidate	Votes	%
Liberal	Monique Gagnon-Tremblay	16,562	52.32
Parti Québécois	Guillaume Breault-Duncan	9,926	31.36
Action démocratique	Michel-André Samson	4,541	14.35
UFP	Suzanne Thériault	314	0.99
Bloc Pot	François Boudreau	310	0.98
Total valid votes		31,653	98.93
Total rejected ballots		342	1.07
Turnout		31,995	71.67
Electors on the lists		44,641	–

1998 Quebec general election
Party	Candidate	Votes	%
Liberal	Monique Gagnon-Tremblay	16,908	51.00
Parti Québécois	Frédéric Dubé	13,229	39.90
Action démocratique	Suzie Larouche	2,575	7.77
Socialist Democracy	Patrick Jasmin	296	0.89
Natural Law	Daniel Jolicoeur	106	0.32
Marxist–Leninist	Serge Lachapelle	42	0.13
Total valid votes		33,156	99.10
Total rejected ballots		301	0.90
Turnout		33,457	79.60
Electors on the lists		342,031	–

1994 Quebec general election
Party	Candidate	Votes	%
Liberal	Monique Gagnon-Tremblay	15,861	49.48
Parti Québécois	René Turcotte	13,245	41.32
Action démocratique	Alain Boulanger	2,422	7.56
Natural Law	Eric E. Simon	294	0.76
Equality	Murray D. Powell	236	0.59
Total valid votes		32,058	97.89
Total rejected ballots		692	2.11
Turnout		32,750	82.20
Electors on the lists		39,844	–

1989 Quebec general election
Party	Candidate	Votes	%
Liberal	Monique Gagnon-Tremblay	14,961	51.97
Parti Québécois	Réal Rancourt	10,492	36.45
Unity	Richard Evans	1,881	6.53
New Democratic	Peter Julian	884	3.07
Parti 51	France Bougie	568	1.97
Total valid votes		28,786	96.32
Total rejected ballots		1,099	3.68
Turnout		29,885	74.98
Electors on the lists		39,856	–

1985 Quebec general election
Party	Candidate	Votes	%
Liberal	Monique Gagnon-Tremblay	15,571	53.85
Parti Québécois	Réal Rancourt	11,960	41.37
New Democratic	Sarah Johnson	1,220	4.22
Christian Socialism	Élise Bérubé	162	0.56
Total valid votes		28,913	98.09
Total rejected ballots		563	1.91
Turnout		29,476	74.25
Electors on the lists		39,700	–

== See also ==
- List of Quebec leaders of the Opposition
- Politics of Quebec
- Quebec general elections
- Timeline of Quebec history

Political offices
Preceded by Monique Jerome-Forget	President of the Treasury Board; 2008-2010	Succeeded by Michelle Courchesne
Preceded by Lise Bacon	Deputy Premier of Quebec; 1994	Succeeded by Bernard Landry
Preceded by Daniel Johnson, Jr.	Leader of the Opposition in Quebec; 1998	Succeeded by Jean Charest
Preceded by Bernard Landry	Deputy Premier of Quebec; May 2003 – Feb 2005	Succeeded by Jacques P. Dupuis
Preceded by Gérard D. Levesque	Minister of Finance (Quebec); 1993–1994	Succeeded by André Bourbeau
Preceded by Louise Beaudoin	Minister of International Relations; 2003–2008	Succeeded by Pierre Arcand
Preceded by Pierre Arcand	Minister of International Relations (2nd time); 2010–2012	Succeeded by Jean-François Lisée
