= Jean-A. Joly =

Canadian politician (born 1939)

Jean-A. Joly (born August 29, 1939) is a Canadian politician from Quebec. He served as a Liberal member of the National Assembly of Quebec from 1985 to 1994.

He should not be confused with a different Jean Joly who has been a municipal politician in Notre-Dame-de-l'Île-Perrot.

== Early life and career ==
Joly was born in Montreal. He was a technician in the Royal Canadian Air Force from 1956 to 1959 and later worked as a life insurance sales manager. Before running for office, he was known for his involvement in anti-drug campaigns.

== Legislator ==
Joly was first elected to the Quebec legislature in the 1985 provincial election, defeating Parti Québécois incumbent Michel Leduc in the Laval division of Fabre. The Liberals won a majority government in this election, and Joly entered the legislature as a backbench supporter of Robert Bourassa's government. In 1988, he was part of a group of Liberal legislators who pressured manpower and income security minister Pierre Paradis to remove the harsher aspects of a welfare reform bill. Joly supported both a subway line and the extension of Highway 440 into Laval during the late 1980s.

He was re-elected to a second term in the 1989 provincial election and supported Robert Bourassa's shift to Quebec nationalism in 1990 after the failure of the Meech Lake Accord on reforming the Canadian constitution. He did not seek re-election in 1994.

Joly has served as president of the Fondation des parlementaires Québécois.

== Federal politics ==
Jean-A. Joly
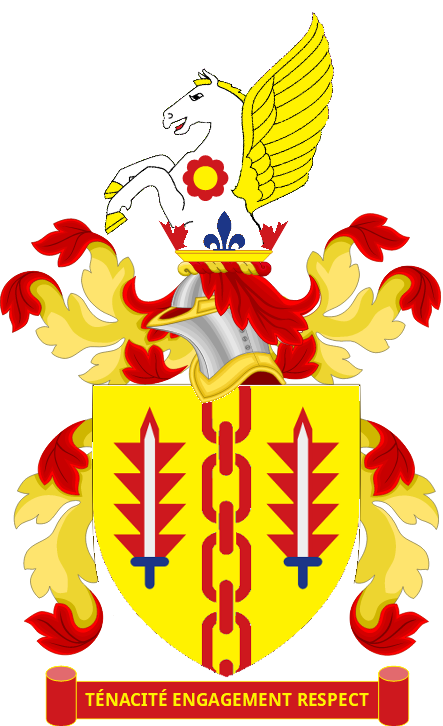
- Crest: Issuant from a coronet rim Or heightened with maple leaves Gules alternating with fleurs-de-lis Azure a demi pegasus Argent crined unguled and queued Or displaying on the shoulder a cog wheel Gules charged with a bezant.
- Shield: Or a chain palewise Gules between two swords erect points upwards blades Argent enflamed Gules hilts and pommels Azure.
- Motto: TÉNACITÉ · ENGAGEMENT · RESPECT

Joly campaigned on behalf of Liberal Party of Canada candidate Michel Dupuy in the 1993 Canadian federal election. The federal and provincial Liberal parties are not aligned in Quebec, and not all provincial Liberals support the federal party.

== Electoral record ==
1989 Quebec general election: Fabre
Party	Candidate	Votes	%	±%
Liberal	Jean-A. Joly	16,283	51.68	
Parti Québécois	Michel Leduc	13,704	43.50	
Lemon	Luc Cloutier	1,520	4.82	–
Total valid votes		31,507	100.00	
Rejected and declined votes		1,087		
Turnout		32,594	79.31	
Electors on the lists		41,095		

1985 Quebec general election: Fabre
Party	Candidate	Votes	%	±%
Liberal	Jean-A. Joly	15,130	51.38	
Parti Québécois	Michel Leduc	13,199	44.82	
New Democratic	Louis Roy	668	2.27	
Parti indépendantiste	Guy Milot	371	1.26	
Christian Socialist	Jacques Forget	81	0.28	
Total valid votes		29,449	100.00	
Rejected and declined votes		483		
Turnout		29,932	80.19	
Electors on the lists		37,327		
