= Gérard D. Levesque =

Canadian politician

Gérard D. Levesque (May 2, 1926 – November 17, 1993) was a longtime Quebec politician and Cabinet minister, who twice served as interim leader of the Quebec Liberal Party.

== Biography ==
Levesque was first elected to what is now called the Quebec National Assembly in the riding of Bonaventure in 1956 and sat in the legislature continuously until the end of his life. Under Premier Jean Lesage he served as minister of housing and fisheries and then as minister for trade. In the first cabinet of Robert Bourassa, who came to power in 1970, he served in various capacities including minister of trade, Minister of Justice and deputy premier.

After the defeat of the Bourassa government in 1976, Levesque served as Leader of the opposition until 1979, while leaders Robert Bourassa and then Claude Ryan were without parliamentary seats. Levesque was noted for his fierce opposition to what was introduced as Bill 1, the Charter of the French Language; his procedural wrangling meant it had to be eventually reintroduced as Bill 101. Levesque was also interim leader of the party between Bourassa's resignation and the election of Ryan. Levesque again served as Leader of the Opposition and acting leader of the party from August 1982 to September 1983 after the resignation of Ryan and until the return of Bourassa for his second stint as party leader.

In the second Bourassa government, elected in 1985, Levesque served as minister of finance, a position he held until his death in 1993 at the age of 67.

== In popular culture ==
The name of the fictional character Gérard D. Laflaque, protagonist of the satirical TV program Et Dieu créa... Laflaque, is a variation of his name.

== Bibliography ==
- Lambert, Serge (1992). Gérard D. Levesque, le maître politique. Sainte-Foy: GID Design. ISBN 978-2-9802952-0-1. OCLC 26930803.

National Assembly of Quebec
Preceded by Henri Jolicoeur (Union Nationale)	MNA, District of Bonaventure; 1956–1993	Succeeded by Marcel Landry (PQ)
Political offices
Preceded by Jacques-Yvan Morin	Leader of the Opposition in Quebec; 1976–1979	Succeeded by Claude Ryan
Preceded by Claude Ryan	Leader of the Opposition in Quebec; 1982–1985	Succeeded by Robert Bourassa
Preceded by Michel Gratton (Liberal)	Official Opposition House Leader; 1985–1985	Succeeded by Guy Chevrette (PQ)
Preceded by Bernard Landry	Minister of Finance (Quebec); 1985–1993	Succeeded by Monique Gagnon-Tremblay
Vacant Title last held by Pierre Laporte	Deputy Premier of Quebec; 1972–1976	Succeeded by Jacques-Yvan Morin
