= Alice Abou-Khalil =

Canadian politician

Member of the National Assembly of Quebec for Fabre
- In office October 3, 2022 – August 27, 2026
- Preceded by: Monique Sauvé
- Succeeded by: Marie Claude Fournier

Personal details
- Party: Coalition Avenir Québec
- Profession: politician, information technology expert, cybersecurity consultant, and entrepreneur

Alice Abou-Khalil (born 1971) is a Quebec politician and entrepreneur. She was elected as a member of the National Assembly of Quebec in the 2022 Quebec general election. She represented the riding of Fabre as a member of the Coalition Avenir Québec.

== Biography ==
Alice Abou-Khalil was born in 1971 in Lebanon. She is the daughter of a Lebanese father, Robert Abou-Khalil, originally from Blaybel in southeastern Beirut, who died in Quebec in 2021, and a Serbian mother named Ksenia. In 1988, during her adolescence, a shell explosion in the family garden shattered the windows of their home in the village of Aïn Alak, east of Beirut. This event prompted the family to relocate to Canada. Her parents later opened a restaurant in Longueuil, on Montreal's South Shore.

== Political career ==
After volunteering in municipal and federal election campaigns for Liberal and Conservative candidates, Alice Abou-Khalil ran as a candidate for the Coalition Avenir Québec in the 2018 Quebec general election. Her candidacy was announced on March 23, 2018, by party leader François Legault in Laval. She ran in the riding of Chomedey, where she had lived for more than 20 years. Although the CAQ won a majority government, she was defeated, finishing second behind Liberal candidate Guy Ouellette with approximately half his vote total.

Four years later, after serving as president of the Coalition Avenir Québec for two years, she ran again as a CAQ candidate in the 2022 general election, this time in the riding of Fabre. On October 3, 2022, she was elected to the National Assembly of Quebec, defeating the Liberal candidate by a margin of 306 votes.

On December 7, 2022, she was appointed Parliamentary Assistant to the Minister of Cybersecurity and Digital Technology.

She did not seek re-election in the 2026 general election.

== Personal life ==
Alice Abou-Khalil is the mother of two adult children, Giovanni and Kassandra Fares. She is multilingual, speaking Serbian, Lebanese Arabic, French, and English.

== Electoral record ==
2022 Quebec general election: Fabre
| Party | Candidate | Votes | % | ±% |
|---|---|---|---|---|
| Coalition Avenir Québec | Alice Abou-Khalil | 10,912 | 31.81 | -0.75 |
| Liberal | Sonia Baudelot | 10,606 | 30.91 | -6.61 |
| Conservative | Stéphane Turmel | 5,205 | 15.17 | +13.05 |
| Québec solidaire | Jessy Léger | 3,820 | 11.13 | +0.36 |
| Parti Québécois | Catherine Dansereau-Redhead | 3,346 | 9.75 | -3.75 |
| Green | Lynn Buchanan | 418 | 1.22 | -1.44 |
| Total valid votes | | 34,307 | 98.88 | |
| Total rejected ballots | | 390 | 1.12 | -0.36 |
| Turnout | | 34,697 | 62.55 | +1.32 |
| Electors on the lists | | 55,468 | | |
| Coalition Avenir Québec gain from Liberal | | Swing | | +2.93 |
