= Camille Laurin =

Canadian politician

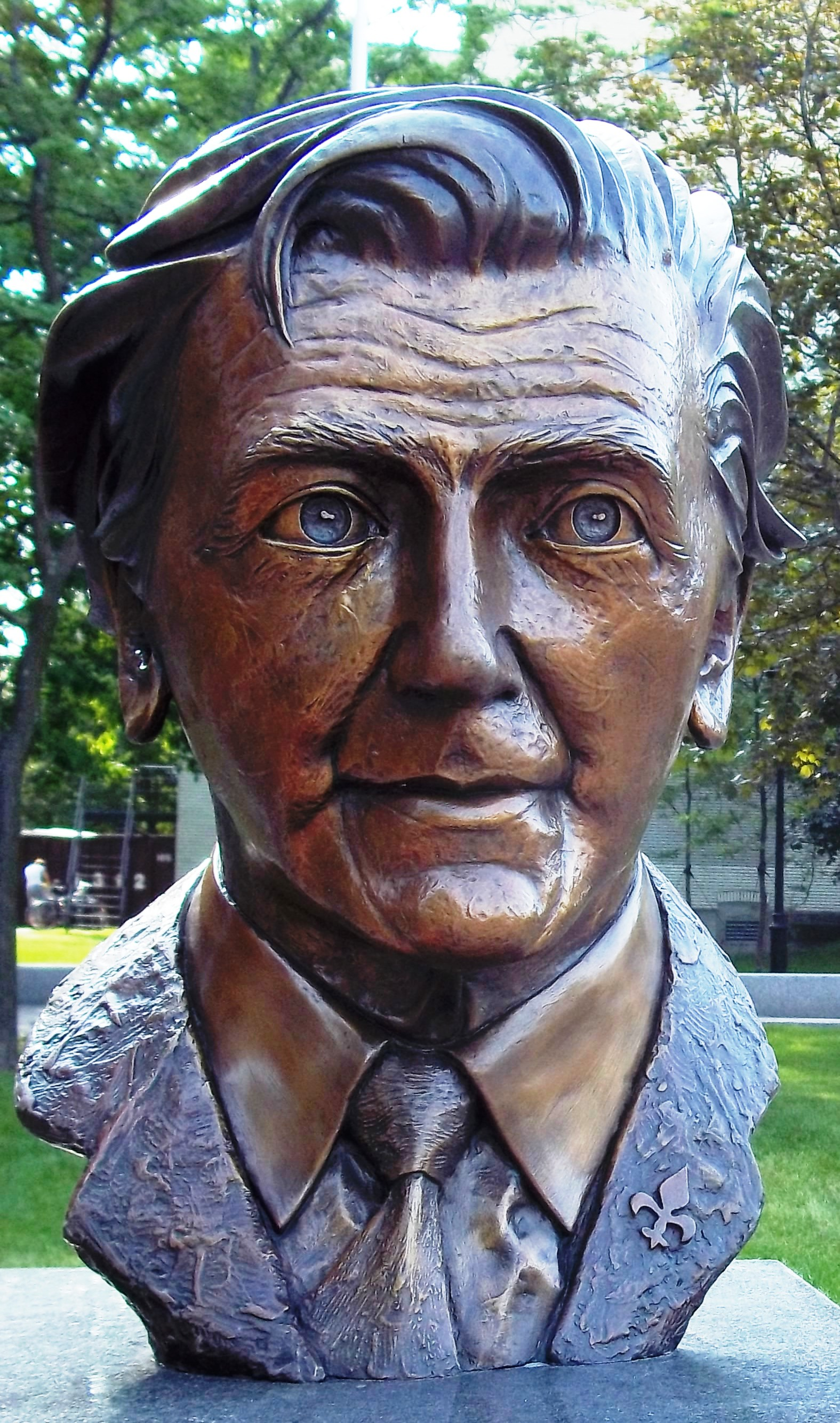
- Bust of Camille Laurin

Deputy Premier of Quebec
- In office March 5, 1984 – November 26, 1984
- Premier: René Lévesque
- Preceded by: Jacques-Yvan Morin
- Succeeded by: Marc-André Bédard

Member of the National Assembly of Quebec for Bourget
- In office 1970–1973
- Preceded by: Paul-Émile Sauvageau
- Succeeded by: Jean Boudreault
- In office 1976–1985
- Preceded by: Jean Boudreault
- Succeeded by: Claude Trudel
- In office 1994–1998
- Preceded by: Huguette Boucher-Bacon
- Succeeded by: Diane Lemieux

Personal details
- Born: May 6, 1922 Charlemagne, Quebec
- Died: March 11, 1999 (aged 76) Vaudreuil-Dorion, Quebec
- Party: Parti Québécois

Camille Laurin ([kamil lɔʁɛ̃] ; May 6, 1922 – March 11, 1999) was a psychiatrist and Parti Québécois (PQ) politician in the Canadian province of Quebec. A MNA member for the riding of Bourget, he is considered the father of Quebec's language law known informally as "Bill 101".

== Biography ==
Born in Charlemagne, Quebec, Laurin obtained a degree in psychiatry from the Université de Montréal where he came under the influence of the Roman Catholic priest, Lionel Groulx. After earning his degree, Laurin went to Boston, Massachusetts, in the United States, where he worked at the Psychopathic Department of Boston State Hospital. Following a stint in Paris in 1957, he returned to practice in Quebec. In 1961, he authored the preface of the book Les fous crient au secours, which described the conditions of psychiatric hospitals of the time.

He was one of the early founders of the Quebec sovereignty movement. As a senior cabinet minister in the first PQ government elected in the 1976 Quebec election, he was the guiding force behind Bill 101, the legislation that placed restrictions on the use of English on public signs and in the workplace of large companies, and strengthened the position of French as the only official language in Quebec.

Laurin resigned from his cabinet position on November 26, 1984 because of a disagreement with Lévesque on the future of the sovereignty movement. He resigned from his seat in the National Assembly on January 25, 1985. He was elected once again to the Assembly on September 12, 1994 but did not run in the 1998 election for health reasons.

He died in 1999 after a long battle with cancer.

== Bibliography ==
- Les fous crient au secours (1961)

== See also ==
- Parti Québécois Crisis, 1984
- Quebec nationalism
- List of third party leaders (Quebec)
- History of Quebec

Political offices
Preceded by Jacques-Yvan Morin	Deputy Premier of Quebec; March 5, 1984 – November 27, 1984	Succeeded by Marc-André Bédard
