= Massawippi River =

Coordinates: 45.3681°N 71.8508°W

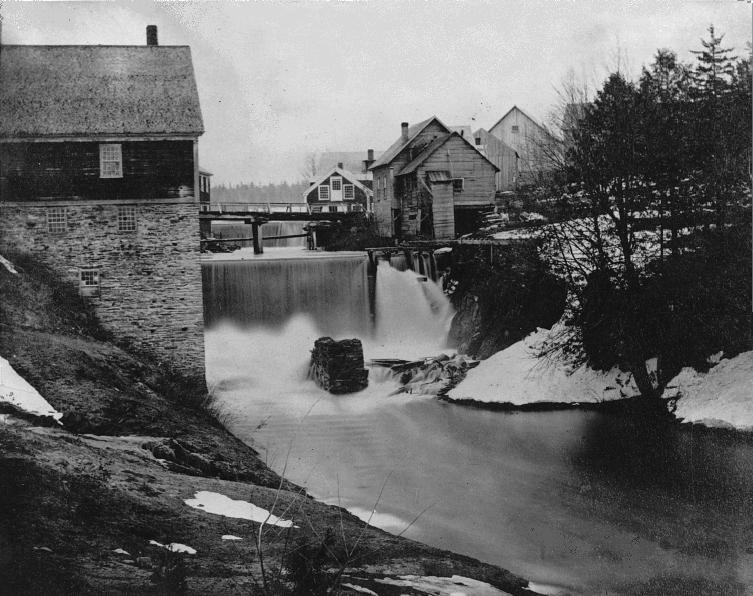
- Native name: Rivière Massawippi (French)

Location
- Country: Canada
- Province: Quebec
- Region: Estrie

Physical characteristics
- Source
  - location: Lake Massawippi
  - elevation: 180 metres (590 ft)
- Mouth
  - location: Saint-François River
  - elevation: 170 metres (560 ft)
- Length: 20 km (12 mi)

Basin features
- River system: Saint Lawrence River

The Massawippi River is a river flowing in the territory of North Hatley (MRC de Memphrémagog) and the city of Sherbrooke, in the administrative region of Estrie, in Quebec, Canada. It is a tributary of the Saint-François River which flows north to the south shore of the Saint Lawrence River.

== Toponymy ==
The hamlet of Massawippi was founded in 1800 by Loyalists. The name Massawippi could come from the Algonquin term nasawipi which means "between the waters". (Nasaw for between or middle and nipi for water.) The term could also come from Abenaki and mean "much clear water." Although the two versions may exist, several places in the area are named by the words used by the Abenaki such as Magog, Lake Memphremagog, Coaticook and Mégantic.

== Geography ==
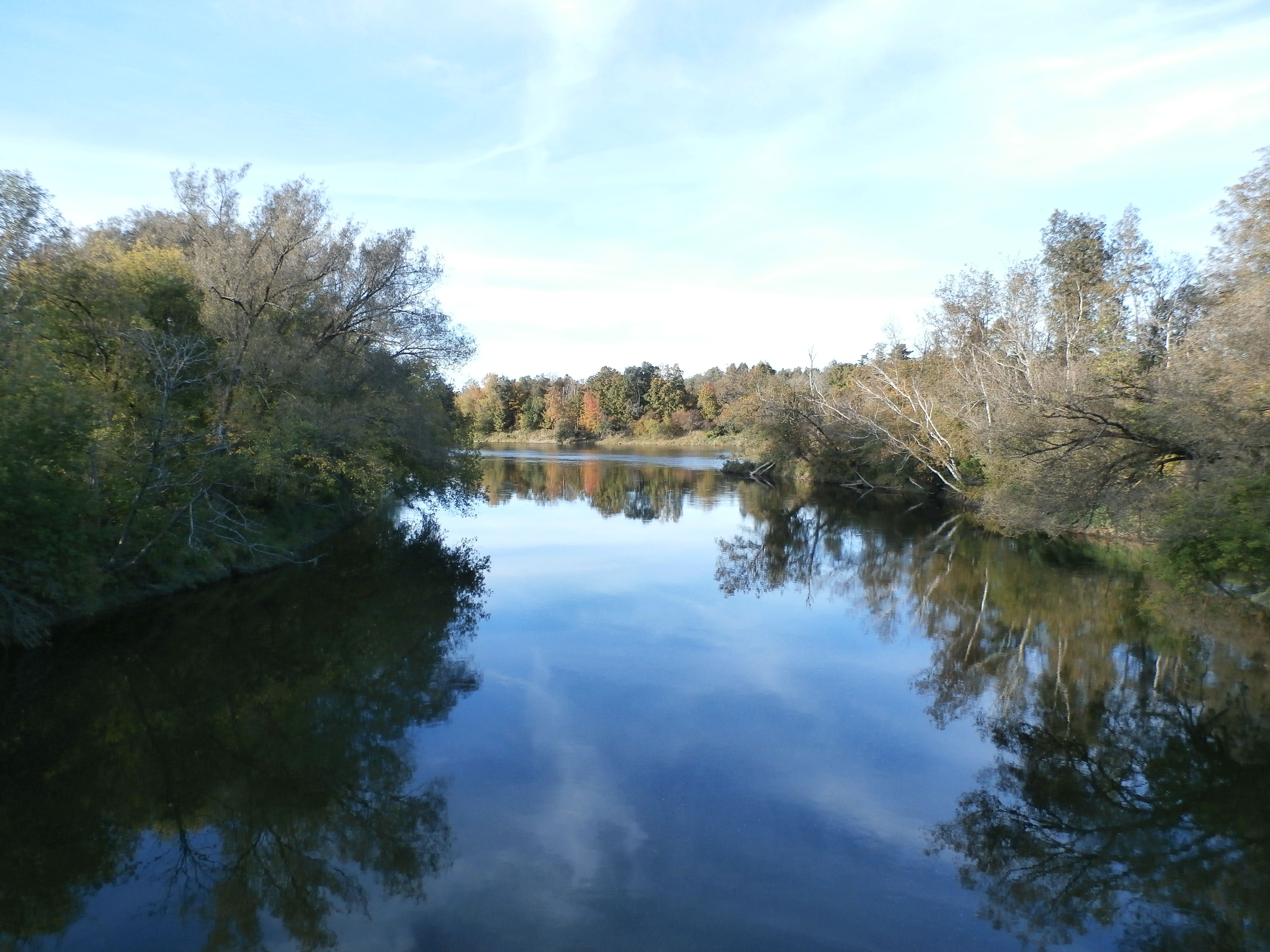
Massawipi river at the confluence of the Saint-François river. Old name: Petite Fourche (Little Forks).

The Massawippi River has its origins in Lake Massawippi at North Hatley. From the North Hatley Bridge at the mouth of Lake Massawippi, this river flows over 19.0 kilometres (11.8 mi), with a drop of 10 metres (33 ft) according to the following segments:

- 1.2 kilometres (0.75 mi) northeast to the North Hatley dam which is located opposite the hamlet of Reidville;
- 9.2 kilometres (5.7 mi) towards the northeast, forming a curve to the east, then a hook to the northwest, collecting the Eustis stream (coming from the west), to the confluence of the Coaticook River (coming from the east);
- 6.6 kilometres (4.1 mi) north, collecting Jack's Creek (from the northwest) and the Eaton River (from the southeast), to its mouth.
- 2.0 kilometres (1.2 mi) towards the north, passing under route 108, under the railway bridge, to its mouth located in the Lennoxville district of the city of Sherbrooke. It flows into the Saint-François River at this location.

The confluence of the river with the Saint-François River was called “petite fourche” (little fork) by the Abenakis, French missionaries and the first settlers, before being known under the name of Lennoxville.

== Tourism ==
An old railway track transformed into a bike path runs along the Massawippi River. The bike path is part of the Route Verte.

== See also ==
- Rivière aux Saumons
  - Moe River
  - Tomifobia River
- List of rivers of Quebec
