= Lorraine Laporte-Landry =

Canadian judge

Lorraine Laporte-Landry (1942 – July 18, 1999) was an influential judge in the Quebec justice system. She was married to former premier Bernard Landry with whom she had three children. She attended the Université de Montréal and HEC Montréal.

She was appointed a Quebec Court judge in March 1995. In the face of opposition claims that Bernard Landry's influence had gotten her the job, the government insisted that she had been chosen in the usual way by an independent selection committee.

She helped train judges in Quebec, Belgium, the Czech Republic and Slovakia.
