= Suzanne Proulx =

Canadian politician

MNA for Sainte-Rose
- In office 2012–2014
- Preceded by: first member
- Succeeded by: Jean Habel

Personal details
- Party: Parti Québécois

Suzanne Proulx is a Canadian politician. She was a Parti Québécois member of the National Assembly of Quebec for the riding of Sainte-Rose from 2012 to 2014, first elected in the 2012 election.

She was nominated as the Bloc Québécois candidate for the riding of Pontiac—Kitigan Zibi in the 2025 Canadian federal election.

At the time of the 2025 Canadian federal election, she lived in Sainte-Agathe-des-Monts.

== Electoral record ==
2025 Canadian federal election: Pontiac—Kitigan Zibi
Party	Candidate	Votes	%	±%	Expenditures
Liberal	Sophie Chatel	32,088	54.60	+10.74	$75,068.00
Conservative	Brian Nolan	16,221	27.60	+6.20	$42,815.94
Bloc Québécois	Suzanne Proulx	6,071	10.33	–4.84	$3,322.26
New Democratic	Gilbert W. Whiteduck	2,971	5.06	–6.29	$18,780.08
Green	Claude Bertrand	749	1.27	–1.63	$4,435.17
People's	Todd Hoffman	673	1.15	–3.33	$7,588.87
Total valid votes		58,773	99.01	+0.17	$145,884.90
Total rejected ballots		587	0.99	–0.17	
Turnout		59,360	69.04	+3.55	
Eligible voters		85,977			
Liberal notional hold		Swing		+2.27	
Source: Elections Canada
