= Moe River (rivière aux Saumons tributary) =

River in Estrie, Quebec (Canada)

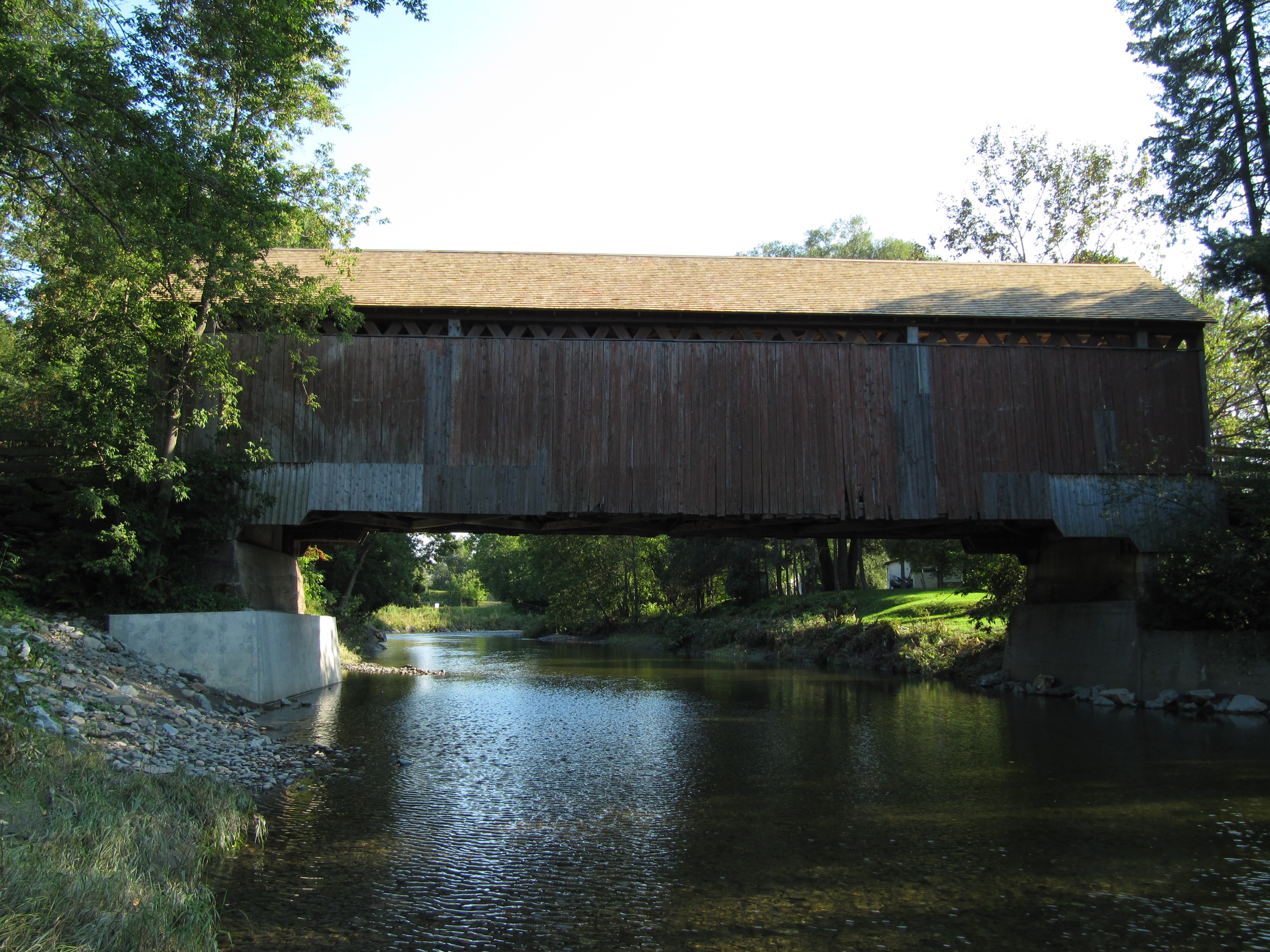
- Milby Bridge on the Moe River near Waterville

- Location within Quebec
- Native name: Rivière Moe (French)

Location
- Country: Canada
- Province: Quebec
- Region: Estrie
- Ville: Sherbrooke

Physical characteristics
- Source: Unidentified lake
  - location: East Hereford
  - coordinates: 45.085675°N 71.498688°W
  - elevation: 462 m (1,516 ft)
- Mouth: Rivière aux Saumons
  - location: Sherbrooke
  - coordinates: 45.31861°N 71.82417°W
  - elevation: 150 m (490 ft)
- Length: 36.7 km (22.8 mi)

Basin features
- Progression: Rivière aux Saumons, Massawippi River, Saint-François River, Saint Lawrence River
- Tributaries
  - left: (upstream) deux décharges de lac, ruisseau Bélanger, décharge du lac Lippé
  - right: (upstream) ruisseau Adam, ruisseau Audet, ruisseau Hébert, décharge du lac Duquette.

The Moe River is a watercourse flowing in the administrative region of Estrie to Quebec, Canada. It is a tributary of the rivière aux Saumons which successively flows into the Massawippi River, into the Saint-François River, therefore a sub-tributary of the Saint Lawrence River.

== Geography ==
From Head Lake, the course of the Moe River descends on 36.7 kilometres (22.8 mi) with a drop of 302 metres (991 ft) in the following segments:

upper course of the river (segment of 23.0 kilometres (14.3 mi))

- 2.0 kilometres (1.2 mi) towards the west, especially in the forest zone, crossing the Chemin Saint-Jacques, to the outlet (coming from the south) of Lac Lippé;
- 6.8 kilometres (4.2 mi) first west, passing north of Saint-Herménégilde airport, then north-west, crossing route 251 (north-south) and the 9e rang road (east-west) to the outlet (coming from the east) of Lac Duquette;
- 8.4 kilometres (5.2 mi) towards the north-west, first passing under the Carbonneau bridge (chemin du 10e rang), then winding through forest and agricultural areas, until a stream (coming from the south-West);
- 5.8 kilometres (3.6 mi) towards the north-west, winding through an area that is sometimes agricultural, sometimes forested, crossing the Chemin de la Grande-Ligne, Chemin Léon-Gérin, Chemin de Hyatt's Mills (twice), to Hyatt's Mills Bridge (Moe's River Road);

lower course of the river (segment of 13.7 kilometres (8.5 mi))

- 3.5 kilometres (2.2 mi) first to the north-west, then to the north, crossing a series of rapids at the end of the segment, to the Audet stream (coming from the east);
- 2.9 kilometres (1.8 mi) northwesterly to the Moe's River bridge;
- 6.7 kilometres (4.2 mi) north, crossing Cookshire Road and Ives Hill Road, to Milby Bridge (McVety Road);
- 0.6 kilometres (0.37 mi) north along route 147, up to its mouth.

Fed by several small streams at the foot of Mount Hereford, the Moe River follows a very narrow and winding course, passes through the village of Compton and is a branch of the rivière aux Saumons (Massawippi River tributary) (not to be confused with the rivière au Saumon (Le Haut-Saint-François)); it flows into the Massawippi River, near Lennoxville which is merged with Saint-François River, in Sherbrooke, in Estrie.

== History ==
The name of this watercourse perpetuates the memory of Austin Moe, a native of Vermont who settled in Ascot Township in 1795. He was one of Gilbert Hyatt's associates, founder of Hyatt's Mills, today Sherbrooke. The hamlet of Moe's River, a small exclusively agricultural agglomeration, was developed around the middle of the 19th century on the west bank of the river. Despite the francization of the generic, the spelling of the English toponym, by omitting the apostrophe, that is to say Moes, was perpetuated for a certain time.

The toponym "rivière Moe" was made official on December 13, 1996, at the Commission de toponymie du Québec.

== See also ==
- St. Lawrence River
- List of rivers of Quebec
