= Sainte-Rose (provincial electoral district) =

Provincial electoral district in Quebec, Canada

Coordinates: 45.589°N 73.787°W

Quebec electoral district
- Location in Laval

Provincial electoral district
- Legislature: National Assembly of Quebec
MNA
Cécile Tremblay
Liberal
- District created: 2011
- First contested: 2012
- Last contested: 2026

Demographics
- Population (2006): 61,060
- Electors (2012): 49,279
- Area (km²): 41.2
- Pop. density (per km²): 1,482
- Census division: Laval (part)
- Census subdivision: Laval (part)

Sainte-Rose (French pronunciation: [sɛ̃t ʁoz]) is a provincial electoral district in Quebec, Canada, that elects members to the National Assembly of Quebec. It is located within the city of Laval.

It was created for the 2012 election from parts of Fabre and Vimont electoral districts.

Including its predecessor ridings (Vimont from 1981 to 2012 and Fabre before that), Sainte-Rose has voted for the governing party in every election since 1970.

== Members of the National Assembly ==
Legislature	Years	Member	Party
Riding created from Fabre and Vimont
40th	2012–2014	Suzanne Proulx	Parti Québécois
41st	2014–2018	Jean Habel	Liberal
42nd	2018–2022	Christopher Skeete	Coalition Avenir Québec
43rd	2022–2026	Christopher Skeete	Coalition Avenir Québec
44th	2026–Present	Cécile Tremblay	Liberal

== Election results ==
2026 Quebec general election
** Preliminary results — Not yet official **
Party	Candidate	Votes	%	±%
Liberal	Cécile Tremblay	14,123	37.48	
Parti Québécois	Judith Cardin	8,978	23.83	
Conservative	Alexandre Arrata	5,009	13.29	
Coalition Avenir Québec	Christopher Skeete	4,836	12.83	
Québec solidaire	Karine Cliche	4,368	11.59	
Green	Mustapha Jaalouk	224	0.59	
Climat Québec	Anne-Marie Tougas	145	0.38	
Total valid votes				
Total rejected ballots				
Turnout			65.55	
Electors on the lists			–	–
Liberal gain from Coalition Avenir Québec		Swing		+
Source: Élections Québec

2022 Quebec general election
Party	Candidate	Votes	%	±%
Coalition Avenir Québec	Christopher Skeete	14,091	38.50	+1.66
Liberal	Michel Trottier	8,778	23.98	–6.14
Québec solidaire	Karine Cliche	5,243	14.33	+0.45
Parti Québécois	Lyne Jubinville	4,536	12.39	–2.11
Conservative	Stéphanie Beauchamp	3,429	9.37	+8.21
Green	Pierrette Kamning Nguendjong	304	0.83	–1.69
Climat Québec	Simon Filiatrault	128	0.35	–
Parti 51	Kevin Fortin	91	0.25	–
Total valid votes		36,600	98.68	+0.15
Total rejected ballots		490	1.32	–0.15
Turnout		37,090	67.56	–2.45
Electors on the lists		54,902	–	–

2018 Quebec general election
Party	Candidate	Votes	%	±%
Coalition Avenir Québec	Christopher Skeete	13,491	36.84	+12.79
Liberal	Jean Habel	11,029	30.12	-12.08
Parti Québécois	Marc-André Constantin	5,309	14.50	-12.79
Québec solidaire	Simon Charron	5,082	13.88	+8.10
Green	Caroline Bergevin	923	2.52	
Conservative	Benoit Blanchard	423	1.16	
New Democratic	Alain Giguère	250	0.68	
CINQ	Valérie Louis-Charles	110	0.30	
Total valid votes		36,617	98.53	
Total rejected ballots		546	1.47	
Turnout		37,163	70.01	
Eligible voters		53,080		
Coalition Avenir Québec gain from Liberal		Swing		+12.44
Source(s) "Rapport des résultats officiels du scrutin". Élections Québec.

2014 Quebec general election
Party	Candidate	Votes	%	±%
Liberal	Jean Habel	16,520	42.20	+13.67
Parti Québécois	Suzanne Proulx	10,681	27.29	-7.57
Coalition Avenir Québec	Domenico Cavaliere	9,413	24.05	-5.55
Québec solidaire	André da Silva Pereira	2,262	5.78	+1.42
Option nationale	Bruno Forget	269	0.69	-1.28
Total valid votes		39,145	98.46	
Total rejected ballots		614	1.54	
Turnout		39,759	78.23	
Electors on the lists		50,826		
Liberal gain from Parti Québécois		Swing		+10.62

2014 reference:

2012 Quebec general election
Party	Candidate	Votes	%	±%
Parti Québécois	Suzanne Proulx	13,508	34.86	-5.24
Coalition Avenir Québec	François Gaudreau	11,470	29.60	+17.10
Liberal	Geneviève April	11,054	28.53	-13.77
Québec solidaire	Nicolas Chatel-Launay	1,689	4.36	+0.50
Option nationale	Sylvain Fortin	764	1.97	
Independent	Ioan-Adrian Hancu	263	0.68	
Total valid votes		38,748	98.86	
Total rejected ballots		445	1.14	
Turnout		39,193	79.12	
Electors on the lists		49,539	–	
Parti Québécois gain from Liberal		Swing		+4.27

^ Change is from redistributed results; CAQ change is from ADQ

== See also ==
- List of Quebec provincial electoral districts
- Canadian provincial electoral districts
