= Stanstead-Est =

- Municipality
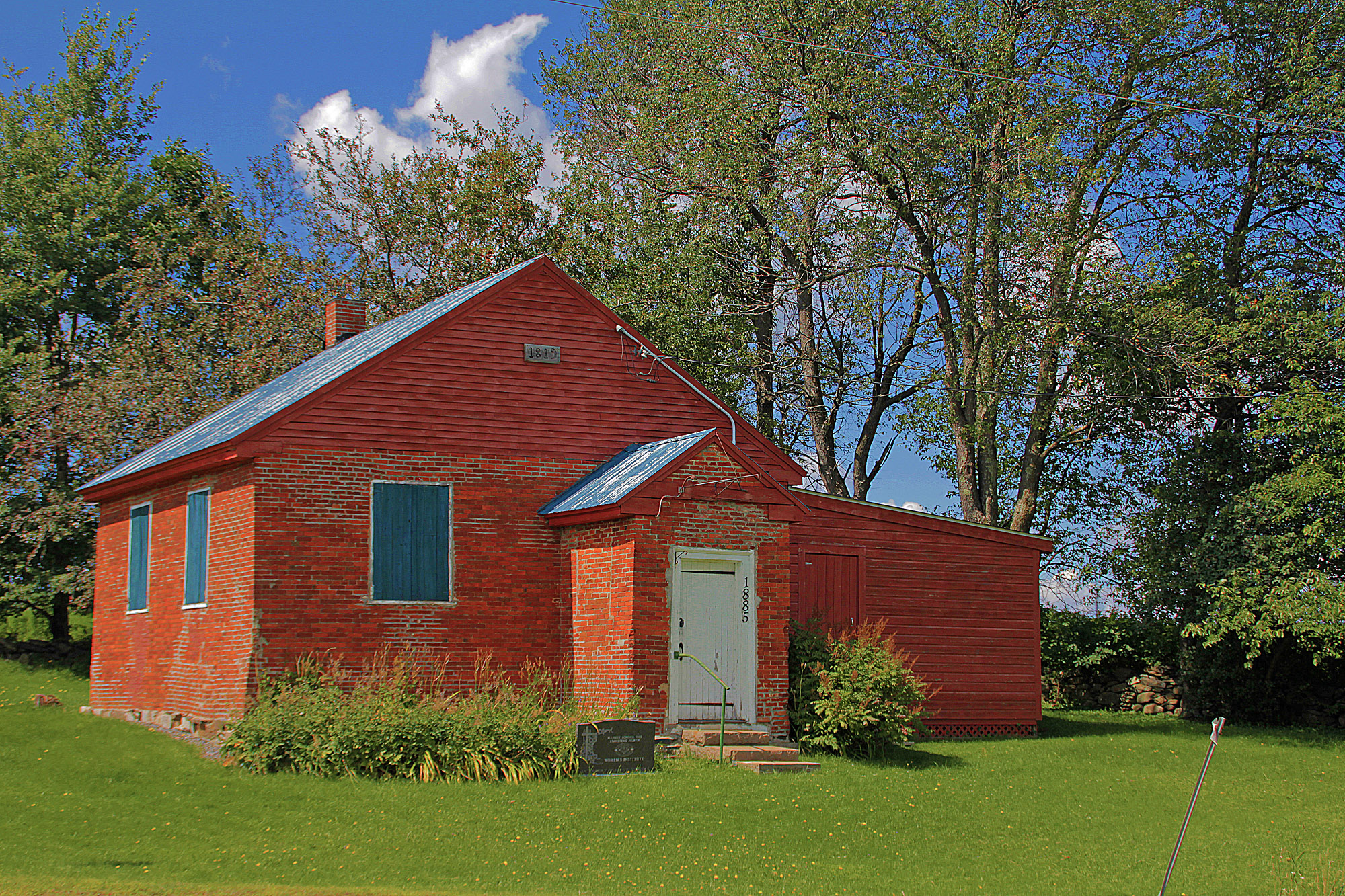
- Mansur Rural School in Stanstead-Est

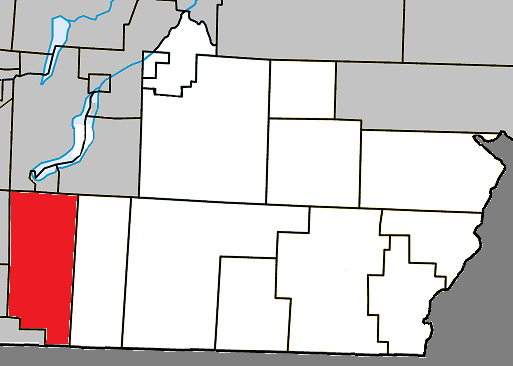
- Location within Coaticook RCM.

- Location in southern Quebec.
- Coordinates: 45°06′N 72°03′W
- Country: Canada
- Province: Quebec
- Region: Estrie
- RCM: Coaticook
- Constituted: July 16, 1932

Government
  - Mayor: PAMELA B. STEEN
  - Federal riding: Compton—Stanstead
  - Prov. riding: Saint-François

Area
  - Total: 116.10 km^{2} (44.83 sq mi)
  - Land: 114.54 km^{2} (44.22 sq mi)

Population (2021)
  - Total: 642
  - Density: 5.6/km^{2} (15/sq mi)
  - Pop 2016-2021: ▲9.9%
  - Dwellings: 314
- Time zone: UTC−5 (EST)
  - Summer (DST): UTC−4 (EDT)
- Postal code(s): J0B 3E0
- Area code: 819
- Highways A-55: R-141; R-143

Stanstead-Est is a municipality in Quebec.

== Demographics ==
=== Population ===
Population trend:

Census	Population	Change (%)
2021	642	▲9.9%
2016	584	▼3.2%
2011	603	▼4.0%
2006	628	▼5.0%
2001	661	▼1.0%
1996	668	▼2.6%
1991	686	N/A

== See also ==
- List of anglophone communities in Quebec
