= Monique Sauvé =

Canadian politician (born 1960)

Member of the National Assembly of Quebec for Fabre
- In office November 9, 2015 – August 28, 2022
- Preceded by: Gilles Ouimet
- Succeeded by: Alice Abou-Khalil

Personal details
- Born: January 28, 1960 (age 66) Montreal, Quebec, Canada
- Party: Liberal
- Education: McGill University
- Profession: Businesswoman

Monique Sauvé (French pronunciation: [mɔnik sove]; born January 28, 1960) is a Canadian politician, who was elected to the National Assembly of Quebec in a by-election on November 9, 2015. She represented the electoral district of Fabre as a member of the Quebec Liberal Party until her retirement from politics at the 2022 Quebec general election.

== Biography ==
She studied at McGill University, obtaining a Bachelor's in Psychology in 1981 and management in 1985.

Two years later, she founded her own placement agency, Personnel Métro, which she presided over until 1996. She was also director of the Montreal division of the Réseau des femmes d'affaires du Québec from 1993 to 1995.

Prior to her election, she ran the Carrefour Emploi Jeunesse de Laval from 1997 to 2015.
