= Cécile Tremblay =

Cécile Tremblay MNA

Member of the National Assembly for Sainte-Rose
- Incumbent
- Assumed office October 5, 2026
- Preceded by: Christopher Skeete

Personal details
- Party: Liberal

Cécile Tremblay is a Canadian scientist and politician who is a candidate for the National Assembly of Quebec for Sainte-Rose in the 2026 Quebec general election as a member of the Quebec Liberal Party.

== Electoral record ==
2026 Quebec general election: Sainte-Rose
** Preliminary results — Not yet official **
Party	Candidate	Votes	%	±%
Liberal	Cécile Tremblay	14,123	37.48	
Parti Québécois	Judith Cardin	8,978	23.83	
Conservative	Alexandre Arrata	5,009	13.29	
Coalition Avenir Québec	Christopher Skeete	4,836	12.83	
Québec solidaire	Karine Cliche	4,368	11.59	
Green	Mustapha Jaalouk	224	0.59	
Climat Québec	Anne-Marie Tougas	145	0.38	
Total valid votes				
Total rejected ballots				
Turnout			65.55	
Electors on the lists			–	–
Liberal gain from Coalition Avenir Québec		Swing		+
Source: Élections Québec
