= Guy Hardy (Canadian politician) =

Canadian politician (1950–2025)

Member of the National Assembly of Quebec for Saint-François
- In office 7 April 2014 – 29 August 2018
- Preceded by: Réjean Hébert
- Succeeded by: Geneviève Hébert

Personal details
- Party: Quebec Liberal Party

Guy Hardy (15 May 1950 – 17 October 2025) was a Canadian politician. Hardy was elected to the National Assembly of Quebec in the 2014 election. He represented the electoral district of Saint-François as a member of the Quebec Liberal Party, but did not run for re-election in 2018. Hardy died on 17 October 2025, at the age of 75.

== Death ==
Guy Hardy, aged 75, has died, as confirmed by the Quebec Liberal Party in a statement on 17 October 2025.
