= Gilles Ouimet =

Canadian politician

MNA for Fabre
- In office 2012–2015
- Preceded by: Michelle Courchesne
- Succeeded by: Monique Sauvé

Personal details
- Party: Liberal

Gilles Ouimet is a former Canadian politician, who was a Quebec Liberal Party member of the National Assembly of Quebec for the riding of Fabre.

First elected in the 2012 election, he announced his resignation from the legislature in August 2015.
