= Martinville, Quebec =

Martinville
- Municipality
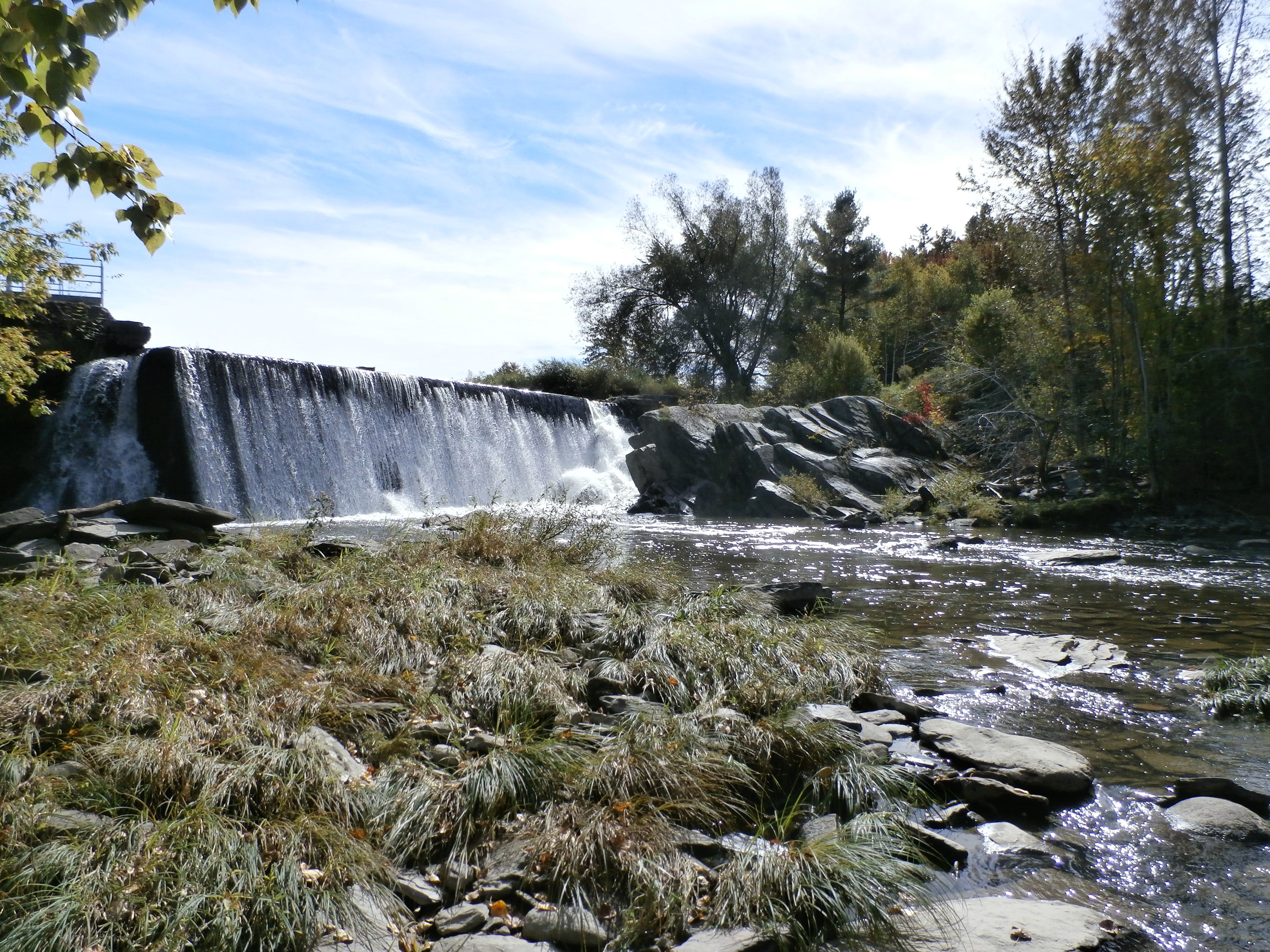

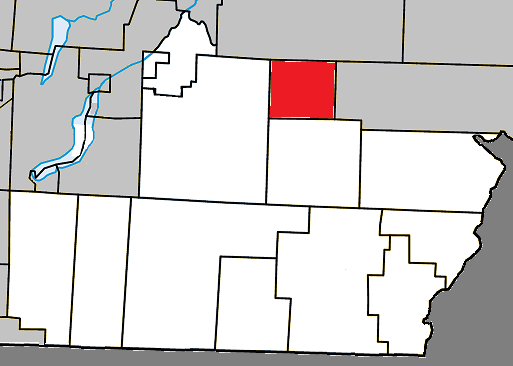
- Location within Coaticook RCM

- Location in southern Quebec
- Coordinates: 45.27°N 71.72°W
- Country: Canada
- Province: Quebec
- Region: Estrie
- RCM: Coaticook
- Constituted: December 21, 1895

Government
  - Mayor: Réjean Masson
  - Federal riding: Compton—Stanstead
  - Prov. riding: Saint-François

Area
  - Total: 48.40 km^{2} (18.69 sq mi)
  - Land: 48.46 km^{2} (18.71 sq mi)
- There is an apparent contradiction between two authoritative sources

Population (2011)
  - Total: 469
  - Density: 9.7/km^{2} (25/sq mi)
  - Pop 2006-2011: ▲0.4%
  - Dwellings: 179
- Time zone: UTC−5 (EST)
  - Summer (DST): UTC−4 (EDT)
- Postal code(s): J0B 2A0
- Area code: 819
- Highways: R-208; R-251

Martinville (French: [maʁtɛ̃vil], Quebec French: [maʁtẽvɪl]) is a municipality within the Coaticook Regional County Municipality of Quebec, Canada. The population was 469 in the Canada 2011 Census.

== Demographics ==
=== Population ===
Population trend:

Census	Population	Change (%)
2011	469	▲0.4%
2006	467	▼0.2%
2001	468	▼1.7%
1996	476	▼2.5%
1991	488	N/A
