= Fabre (electoral district) =

Provincial electoral district in Quebec, Canada

Quebec electoral district
- Location in Laval
- Coordinates: 45.544°N 73.837°W

Provincial electoral district
- Legislature: National Assembly of Quebec
MNA
Marie Claude Fournier
Liberal
- District created: 1965
- First contested: 1966
- Last contested: 2026

Demographics
- Electors (2015): 50,074
- Area (km²): 45.1
- Census division: Laval (part)
- Census subdivision: Laval (part)

Fabre (French pronunciation: [fabʁ]) is a provincial electoral district in Quebec, Canada, that elects members to the National Assembly of Quebec. The district is located in Laval and includes the westernmost portion of Île Jésus (or Île de Laval) west of Autoroute 15 in the northern half of the district and west of Autoroute 13 in the southern half.

It was created for the 1966 election from a part of Laval electoral district electoral district.

In the change from the 2001 to the 2011 electoral map, it lost part of its territory to the newly created Sainte-Rose electoral district, but gained some territory from Chomedey.

In the change from the 2011 to 2017 electoral map, it will gain some more territory from Chomedey, in the area around Parc Le Boutillier.

The district is named after Édouard-Charles Fabre who was the third archbishop of the Roman Catholic Archdiocese of Montreal from 1876 to 1896.

== Members of the Legislative Assembly / National Assembly ==
Legislature	Years	Member	Party
Riding created from Laval
28th	1966–1970	Gilles Houde	Liberal
29th	1970–1973	Gilles Houde	Liberal
30th	1973–1976	Gilles Houde	Liberal
31st	1976–1981	Bernard Landry	Parti Québécois
32nd	1981–1985	Michel Leduc	Parti Québécois
33rd	1985–1989	Jean-A. Joly	Liberal
34th	1989–1994	Jean-A. Joly	Liberal
35th	1994–1998	Joseph Facal	Parti Québécois
36th	1998–2003	Joseph Facal	Parti Québécois
37th	2003–2007	Michelle Courchesne	Liberal
38th	2007–2008	Michelle Courchesne	Liberal
39th	2008–2012	Michelle Courchesne	Liberal
40th	2012–2014	Gilles Ouimet	Liberal
41st	2014–2015	Gilles Ouimet	Liberal
41st	2015–2018	Monique Sauvé	Liberal
42nd	2018–2022	Monique Sauvé	Liberal
43rd	2022–2026	Alice Abou-Khalil	Coalition Avenir Québec
44th	2026–Present	Marie Claude Fournier	Liberal

== Election results ==
2026 Quebec general election
The 2026 general election will be held on October 5.
Party	Candidate	Votes	%	±%
Liberal	Marie Claude Fournier	15,043	42.7	
Parti Québécois	Catherine Dansereau-Redhead	6,968	19.8	
Conservative	Stéphane Turmel	6,080	17.3	
Québec solidaire	Josée Chevalier	3,439	9.8	
Coalition Avenir Québec	Lucie Létourneau	3,118	8.9	
Green	Lynn Buchanan	313	0.9	
Canadian	Qaiser Choudhry	237	0.7	
Total valid votes				
Total rejected ballots				
Turnout				
Electors on the lists				
Source: Élections Québec

2022 Quebec general election
Party	Candidate	Votes	%	±%
Coalition Avenir Québec	Alice Abou-Khalil	10,912	31.81	-0.75
Liberal	Sonia Baudelot	10,606	30.91	-6.61
Conservative	Stéphane Turmel	5,205	15.17	+13.05
Québec solidaire	Jessy Léger	3,820	11.13	+0.36
Parti Québécois	Catherine Dansereau-Redhead	3,346	9.75	-3.75
Green	Lynn Buchanan	418	1.22	-1.44
Total valid votes		34,307	98.88	
Total rejected ballots		390	1.12	-0.36
Turnout		34,697	62.55	+1.32
Electors on the lists		55,468		
Coalition Avenir Québec gain from Liberal		Swing		+2.93

2018 Quebec general election
Party	Candidate	Votes	%	±%
Liberal	Monique Sauvé	12,147	37.52	-6.45
Coalition Avenir Québec	Adriana Dudas	10,540	32.56	+17.94
Parti Québécois	Odette Lavigne	4,372	13.50	-15.12
Québec solidaire	Nora Yata	3,487	10.77	+4.33
Green	David Gilbert-Parisée	861	2.66	-1.01
Conservative	Juliett Zuniga Lopez	688	2.13	+0.73
New Democratic	Karim Mahmoodi	279	0.86	
Total valid votes		32,374	98.52	
Total rejected ballots		488	1.48	+0.77
Turnout		32,862	61.23	+38.20
Eligible voters		53,670		
Liberal hold		Swing		-12.19
Source(s) "Rapport des résultats officiels du scrutin". Élections Québec.

Quebec provincial by-election, 9 November 2015
Party	Candidate	Votes	%	±%
Liberal	Monique Sauvé	5,035	43.97	-11.17
Parti Québécois	Jibril Akaaboune Le François	3,278	28.63	+7.77
Coalition Avenir Québec	Carla El-Ghandour	1,674	14.62	-3.21
Québec solidaire	Charles Lemieux	738	6.45	+0.77
Green	Kim Raymond	420	3.67	–
Conservative	Jeremy Dohan	160	1.40	–
Option nationale	Valérie Doucet	145	1.27	+0.78
Total valid votes		11,450	99.29	–
Total rejected ballots		82	0.71	-0.45
Turnout		11,532	23.03	-54.20
Eligible voters		50,074		
Liberal hold		Swing		-9.47

2014 Quebec general election
Party	Candidate	Votes	%	±%
Liberal	Gilles Ouimet	20,614	55.14	+17.64
Parti Québécois	François-Gycelain Rocque	7,798	20.86	-7.11
Coalition Avenir Québec	Christopher Skeete	6,667	17.83	-9.94
Québec solidaire	Marie-Claire Des Rochers-Lamarche	2,122	5.68	+2.13
Option nationale	Bernard Paré	181	0.48	-0.61
Total valid votes		37,382	100.00	–
Total rejected ballots		440	1.16	–
Turnout		37,822	77.23	
Electors on the lists		48,972	–	–
Liberal hold		Swing		

2012 Quebec general election
Party	Candidate	Votes	%	±%
Liberal	Gilles Ouimet	13,305	37.50	-10.87
Parti Québécois	François-Gycelain Rocque	9,924	27.97	-6.59
Coalition Avenir Québec	Dominique Anglade	9,852	27.77	+16.46
Québec solidaire	Wilfried Cordeau	1,260	3.55	+0.78
Green	Jean-François Lepage	547	1.54	-1.43
Option nationale	Bruno Forget	388	1.09	
Independent	Philippe Mayrand	207	0.58	
Total valid votes		35,483	98.97	–
Total rejected ballots		371	1.03	–
Turnout		35,854	75.96	
Electors on the lists		47,199	–	–
Liberal hold		Swing		-2.14

^ Change is from redistributed results. CAQ change is from ADQ.

2008 Quebec general election
Party	Candidate	Votes	%	±%
Liberal	Michelle Courchesne	15,349	45.50	
Parti Québécois	François-Gycelain Rocque	12,425	36.83	
Action démocratique	Tom Pentefountas	4,024	11.93	
Green	Erika Alvarez	1,021	3.03	–
Québec solidaire	Pierre Brien	918	2.72	

== See also ==
- List of Quebec provincial electoral districts
- Canadian provincial electoral districts
