= Saint-François (electoral district) =

Provincial electoral district in Quebec, Canada

Coordinates: 45.21°N 71.68°W

Quebec electoral district

Provincial electoral district
- Legislature: National Assembly of Quebec
MNA
Sylvie Tanguay
Parti Québécois
- District created: 1972
- First contested: 1973
- Last contested: 2026

Demographics
- Electors (2014): 54,984
- Area (km²): 1,497.9
- Census subdivision(s): Sherbrooke (part), Barnston-Ouest, Coaticook, Compton, Dixville, East Hereford, Martinville, Sainte-Edwidge-de-Clifton, Saint-Herménégilde, Saint-Malo, Saint-Venant-de-Paquette, Stanstead-Est, Waterville

Saint-François (French pronunciation: [sɛ̃t fʁɑ̃swaz]) is a provincial electoral district in the Estrie region of Quebec, Canada, that elects members to the National Assembly of Quebec. It notably includes parts of the city of Sherbrooke as well as the municipalities of Coaticook and Compton.

It was created for the 1973 election from parts of Compton, Richmond and Sherbrooke electoral districts.

In the change from the 2001 to the 2011 electoral map, it gained territory from Orford and Mégantic-Compton electoral districts, and also gained the Brompton borough of Sherbrooke from Johnson electoral district.

In 2026, it lost Brompton.

== Geography ==
The Saint-François electoral district covers the following territory:

- Barnston-Ouest
- Coaticook
- Compton
- Dixville
- East Hereford
- Hatley
- Martinville
- Sherbrooke — the boroughs of Fleurimont, and Lennoxville
- Sainte-Edwidge-de-Clifton
- Saint-Herménégilde
- Saint-Malo
- Saint-Venant-de-Paquette
- Stanstead-Est
- Waterville

== Members of the National Assembly ==
Legislature	Years	Member	Party
Riding created from Compton, Richmond and Sherbrooke
30th	1973–1976	Gérard Déziel	Liberal
31st	1976–1981	Réal Rancourt	Parti Québécois
32nd	1981–1985	Réal Rancourt	Parti Québécois
33rd	1985–1989	Monique Gagnon-Tremblay	Liberal
34th	1989–1994	Monique Gagnon-Tremblay	Liberal
35th	1994–1998	Monique Gagnon-Tremblay	Liberal
36th	1998–2003	Monique Gagnon-Tremblay	Liberal
37th	2003–2007	Monique Gagnon-Tremblay	Liberal
38th	2007–2008	Monique Gagnon-Tremblay	Liberal
39th	2008–2012	Monique Gagnon-Tremblay	Liberal
40th	2012–2014	Réjean Hébert	Parti Québécois
41st	2014–2018	Guy Hardy	Liberal
42nd	2018–2022	Geneviève Hébert	Coalition Avenir Québec
43rd	2022–2026	Geneviève Hébert	Coalition Avenir Québec
44th	2026–Present	Sylvie Tanguay	Parti Québécois

== Election results ==
2026 Quebec general election
** Preliminary results — Not yet official **
Party	Candidate	Votes	%	±%
Parti Québécois	Sylvie Tanguay	9,709	26.03	
Liberal	Jacqueline Belleau	8,900	23.86	
Conservative	Esteban Méndez-Hord	6,611	17.73	
Coalition Avenir Québec	Geneviève Hébert	6,217	16.67	
Québec solidaire	Mia Fréchette	5,416	14.52	
Climat Québec	Rémi Tétreault	271	0.73	
Présence	Sylvie Peloquin	170	0.46	
Total valid votes				
Total rejected ballots				
Turnout			68.67	
Electors on the lists			–	–
Parti Québécois gain from Coalition Avenir Québec		Swing		+
Source: Élections Québec

2022 Quebec general election redistributed results
Party	Vote	%
Coalition Avenir Québec	15,384	42.03
Québec solidaire	10,378	28.35
Conservative	4,025	11.00
Parti Québécois	3,232	8.83
Liberal	3,075	8.40
Others	509	1.39

2022 Quebec general election
Party	Candidate	Votes	%	±%
Coalition Avenir Québec	Geneviève Hébert	17,280	42.43	+7.70
Québec solidaire	Mélissa Généreux	11,491	28.21	+5.53
Conservative	Dany Bernier	4,483	11.01	–
Parti Québécois	Sylvie Tanguay	3,712	9.11	-7.08
Liberal	Claude Charron	3,220	7.91	-15.39
Canadian	Colleen McInerney	285	0.70	–
Climat Québec	Olivier Dion	257	0.63	–
Total valid votes		40,728	98.63	–
Total rejected ballots		566	1.37	–
Turnout		41,294	69.45	
Electors on the lists		59,460		

2018 Quebec general election
Party	Candidate	Votes	%	±%
Coalition Avenir Québec	Geneviève Hébert	13,524	34.73	+17.64
Liberal	Charles Poulin	9,074	23.30	-15.23
Québec solidaire	Kévin Côté	8,833	22.68	+14.57
Parti Québécois	Solange Masson	6,304	16.19	-16.72
Green	Mathieu Morin	691	1.77	+0.53
Citoyens au pouvoir	Cyrille Mc Elreavy	514	1.32	
Total valid votes		38,940	98.29	
Total rejected ballots		677	1.71	
Turnout		39,617	69.15	
Eligible voters		57,290		
Coalition Avenir Québec gain from Liberal		Swing		+16.44
Source(s) "Rapport des résultats officiels du scrutin". Élections Québec.

2014 Quebec general election
Party	Candidate	Votes	%
Liberal	Guy Hardy	14,899	38.53
Parti Québécois	Réjean Hébert	12,725	32.91
Coalition Avenir Québec	Gaston Stratford	6,607	17.09
Québec solidaire	André Poulin	3,136	8.11
Green	Vincent J. Carbonneau	478	1.24
Bloc Pot	Philippe Lafrance	292	0.76
Option nationale	Étienne Boudou-Laforce	265	0.69
Conservative	Marcel Collette	181	0.47
Unité Nationale	Lionel Lambert	82	0.21
Total valid votes		38,665	98.52
Total rejected ballots		581	1.48
Turnout		39,246	70.15
Electors on the lists		55,945	–

2012 Quebec general election
Party	Candidate	Votes	%	±%
Parti Québécois	Réjean Hébert	15,303	36.34	-5.70
Liberal	Nathalie Goguen	15,238	36.18	-9.29
Coalition Avenir Québec	Eric Giroux	7,607	18.06	+9.20
Québec solidaire	André Poulin	2,103	4.99	+2.27
Option nationale	Gaby Machabée	932	2.21	
Green	Lindsay-Jane Gowman	809	1.92	+1.64
Unité Nationale	Lionel Lambert	124	0.29	
Total valid votes		42,116	98.64	–
Total rejected ballots		581	1.36	–
Turnout		42,697	77.25	
Electors on the lists		55,274	–	–
Parti Québécois gain from Liberal		Swing		+1.80

2008 Quebec general election
Party	Candidate	Votes	%	±%
Liberal	Monique Gagnon-Tremblay	13,327	46.96	+9.10
Parti Québécois	Réjean Hébert	11,845	41.74	+12.16
Action démocratique	Vincent Marmion	2,230	7.86	-15.99
Québec solidaire	Sandy Tremblay	769	2.71	-0.65
Independent	François Mailly	210	0.74	

2007 Quebec general election
Party	Candidate	Votes	%	±%
Liberal	Monique Gagnon-Tremblay	12,528	37.86	
Parti Québécois	Mariette Fugère	9,788	29.58	
Action démocratique	François Rioux	7,892	23.85	
Green	Anick Proulx	1,772	5.35	–
Québec solidaire	Suzanne Thériault	1,111	3.36	

2003 Quebec general election
Party	Candidate	Votes	%
Liberal	Monique Gagnon-Tremblay	16,562	52.32
Parti Québécois	Guillaume Breault-Duncan	9,926	31.36
Action démocratique	Michel-André Samson	4,541	14.35
UFP	Suzanne Thériault	314	0.99
Bloc Pot	François Boudreau	310	0.98
Total valid votes		31,653	98.93
Total rejected ballots		342	1.07
Turnout		31,995	71.67
Electors on the lists		44,641	–

1998 Quebec general election
Party	Candidate	Votes	%
Liberal	Monique Gagnon-Tremblay	16,908	51.00
Parti Québécois	Frédéric Dubé	13,229	39.90
Action démocratique	Suzie Larouche	2,575	7.77
Socialist Democracy	Patrick Jasmin	296	0.89
Natural Law	Daniel Jolicoeur	106	0.32
Marxist–Leninist	Serge Lachapelle	42	0.13
Total valid votes		33,156	99.10
Total rejected ballots		301	0.90
Turnout		33,457	79.60
Electors on the lists		342,031	–

1995 Quebec referendum
Side	Votes	%
Oui	19,314	50.16
Non	19,193	49.84

1994 Quebec general election
Party	Candidate	Votes	%
Liberal	Monique Gagnon-Tremblay	15,861	49.48
Parti Québécois	René Turcotte	13,245	41.32
Action démocratique	Alain Boulanger	2,422	7.56
Natural Law	Eric E. Simon	294	0.76
Equality	Murray D. Powell	236	0.59
Total valid votes		32,058	97.89
Total rejected ballots		692	2.11
Turnout		32,750	82.20
Electors on the lists		39,844	–

1992 Charlottetown Accord referendum
Side	Votes	%
Non	18,920	57.02
Oui	14,260	42.98

1989 Quebec general election
Party	Candidate	Votes	%
Liberal	Monique Gagnon-Tremblay	14,961	51.97
Parti Québécois	Réal Rancourt	10,492	36.45
Unity	Richard Evans	1,881	6.53
New Democratic	Peter Julian	884	3.07
Parti 51	France Bougie	568	1.97
Total valid votes		28,786	96.32
Total rejected ballots		1,099	3.68
Turnout		29,885	74.98
Electors on the lists		39,856	–

1985 Quebec general election
Party	Candidate	Votes	%
Liberal	Monique Gagnon-Tremblay	15,571	53.85
Parti Québécois	Réal Rancourt	11,960	41.37
New Democratic	Sarah Johnson	1,220	4.22
Christian Socialism	Élise Bérubé	162	0.56
Total valid votes		28,913	98.09
Total rejected ballots		563	1.91
Turnout		29,476	74.25
Electors on the lists		39,700	–

1981 Quebec general election
Party	Candidate	Votes	%
Parti Québécois	Réal Rancourt	15,990	52.08
Liberal	Monique Gagnon-Tremblay	13,866	45.16
Union Nationale	Rolland Boisseau	722	2.35
Communist	Yves Lawler	124	0.41
Total valid votes		30,702	98.93
Total rejected ballots		331	1.07
Turnout		31,033	82.77
Electors on the lists		37,491	–

1980 Quebec referendum
Side	Votes	%
Non	17,377	58.14
Oui	12,513	41.86

1976 Quebec general election
Party	Candidate	Votes	%
Parti Québécois	Réal Rancourt	11,115	41.60
Liberal	Gérard Déziel	7,492	28.04
Union Nationale	Michel Laflamme	6,114	22.89
Ralliement créditiste	Adélard Larose	1,996	7.47
Total valid votes		26,717	97.95
Total rejected ballots		560	2.05
Turnout		27,277	84.96
Electors on the lists		32,104	–

1973 Quebec general election
Party	Candidate	Votes	%
Liberal	Gérard Déziel	12,519	53.38
Parti Québécois	Robert Sabourin	6,840	29,17
Ralliement créditiste	Léo Leboeuf	2,885	12.30
Union Nationale	Yves Dubreuil	1,208	5.15
Total valid votes		23,452	98.43
Total rejected ballots		374	1.57
Turnout		23,826	80.26
Electors on the lists		29,687	–

== See also ==
- List of Quebec provincial electoral districts
- Canadian provincial electoral districts
