= Cable Axion =

Canadian telecommunications company

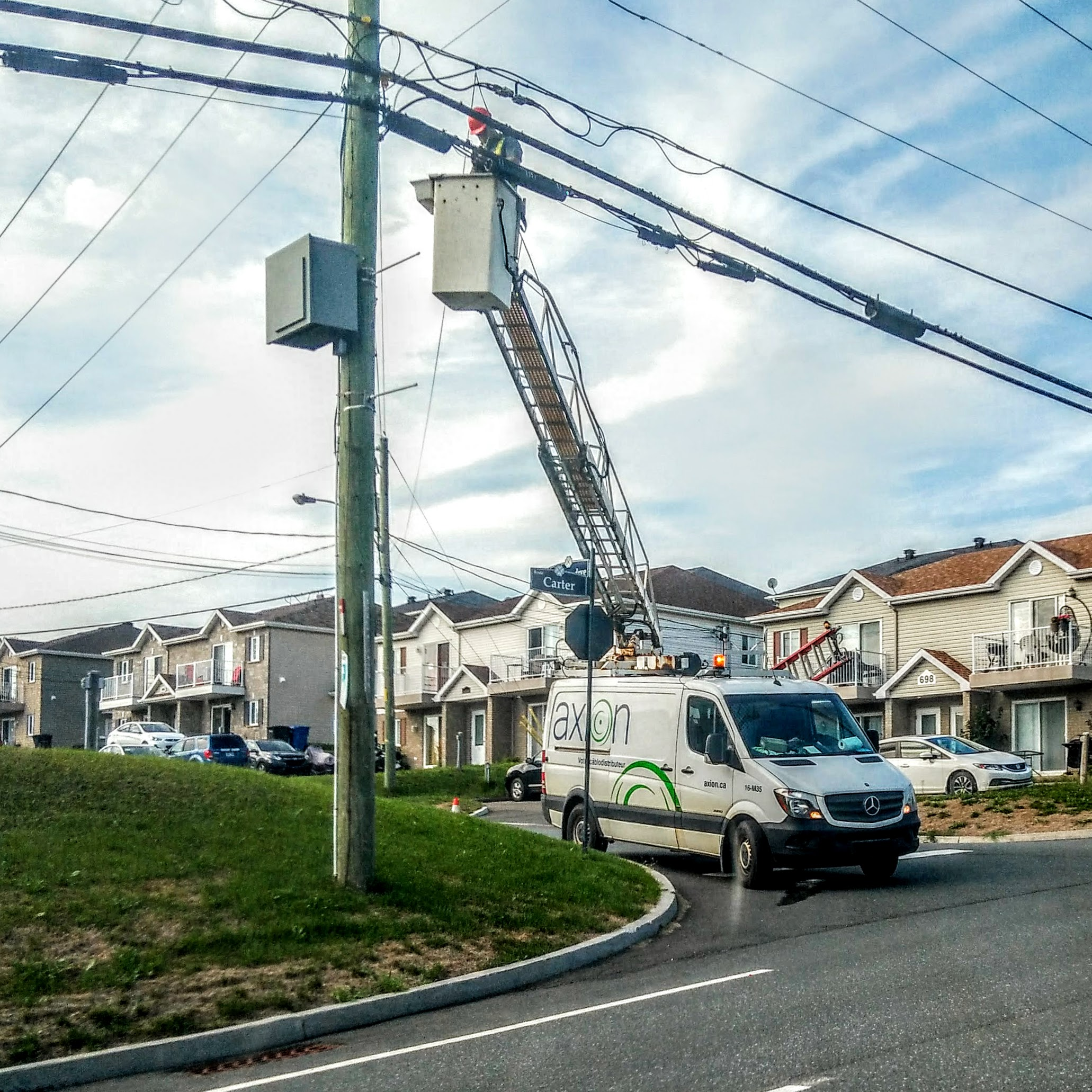
- A technician repairing an optical fibre cable.
- Industry: Telecommunications
- Founded: 1984
- Successor: Cogeco
- Headquarters: Magog, Quebec, Canada

Cable Axion was a cable television distributor and Internet service provider based in Magog, Quebec. In 2018, Cable Axion was acquired by DERYtelecom, which was in turn acquired by Cogeco in 2020.

In August 2023, the Axion brand stopped being used and instead products now use the Cogeco brand.

== Areas of operation ==
- Estrie
  - Austin
  - Barnston
  - Brome
  - Brome Lake
  - Bonsecours
  - Bromptonville
  - Chartierville
  - Compton
  - Cookshire-Eaton
  - Dixville
  - East Hereford
  - Eastman
  - Fitch Bay
  - Georgeville
  - Gould
  - Island Brook
  - Lac Lovering
  - La Patrie
  - Lawrenceville
  - Lingwick
  - Magog
  - Mansonville
  - Martinville
  - Notre-Dame-des-Bois
  - Racine
  - Saint-Camille
  - Saint-Adrien-de-Ham
  - Sainte-Anne-de-la-Rochelle
  - Saint-Denis-de-Brompton
  - Sainte-Edwidge
  - Saint-Étienne-de-Bolton
  - Saint-François-Xavier
  - Saint-Georges-de-Windsor
  - Saint-Herménégilde
  - Saint-Isidore-de-Clifton
  - Saint-Malo
  - Sainte-Marguerite-de-Lingwick
  - Saint-Venant-de-Paquette
  - Sawyerville
  - Scotstown
  - Stanhope
  - Stanstead Township
  - Stukely
  - Val-Joli
- Montérégie
  - Bedford
  - Frelighsburg
  - Lacolle
  - Napierville
  - Saint-Mathieu
  - Saint-Michel
  - Saint-Paul-de-l'Île-aux-Noix
  - Stanbridge-Est
  - Sutton
- Beauce
  - Sainte-Marie
  - Saint-Joseph-de-Beauce
  - Saint-Joseph-des-Érables
  - Saints-Anges
  - Saint-Odilon-de-Cranbourne
  - Saint-Elzéar
  - Saint-Bernard
  - Saint-Jules
  - Saint-Côme–Linière
  - Vallée-Jonction
  - Frampton
- Bellechasse
  - Saint-Malachie
  - Saint-Nazaire
- Les Etchemins
  - Saint-Léon-de-Standon
- Lotbinière
  - Saint-Patrice-de-Beaurivage
  - Saint-Sylvestre
  - Saint-Narcisse
  - Lyster
  - Laurierville
- Mégantic
  - Audet
  - Frontenac
  - Lac-Drolet
  - Lac-Mégantic
  - Marston
  - Milan
  - Nantes
  - Piopolis
  - Saint-Sébastien
  - Sainte-Cécile-de-Whitton
  - Woburn
