= Quebec Route 147 =

Highway in Quebec

Route 147

Route information
- Maintained by Transports Québec
- Length: 41.5 km (25.8 mi)

Major junctions
- South end: VT 147 at the U.S. border in Stanhope
- R-141 / R-206 in Coaticook; R-208 in Compton
- North end: R-108 / R-143 in Waterville

Location
- Country: Canada
- Province: Quebec

Highway system
- Quebec provincial highways; Autoroutes; List; Former
← R-143	→ R-148

Route 147 (QC 147) is a 41.5-kilometre-long (25.8 mi) north–south highway that runs from the Vermont/United States border in the town of Stanhope. The route begins at the Norton–Stanhope Border Crossing in Stanhope. The route runs north through the Coaticook Regional County Municipality, crossing through Coaticook, Compton and Waterville before reaching a junction with QC 108 and QC 143 in Waterville, which marks the northern terminus of QC 147.

== Route description ==
QC 147 begins at the Norton–Stanhope Border Crossing in the community of Stanhope just north of the Canada–United States border; Vermont Route 147 heads south from the border crossing into Norton, Vermont. QC 147 heads north and soon enters the town of Dixville as a two-lane rural road through southern Quebec. QC 147 winds north along St. Lawrence and Atlantic Railroad and the Coaticook River, becoming side-by-side after Chemin Howe. At the junction with Chemin Coward, the route turns away from the railroad for a distance, reaching the developed section of Dixville, which is connected via Rue Baldwin and Chemin Major.

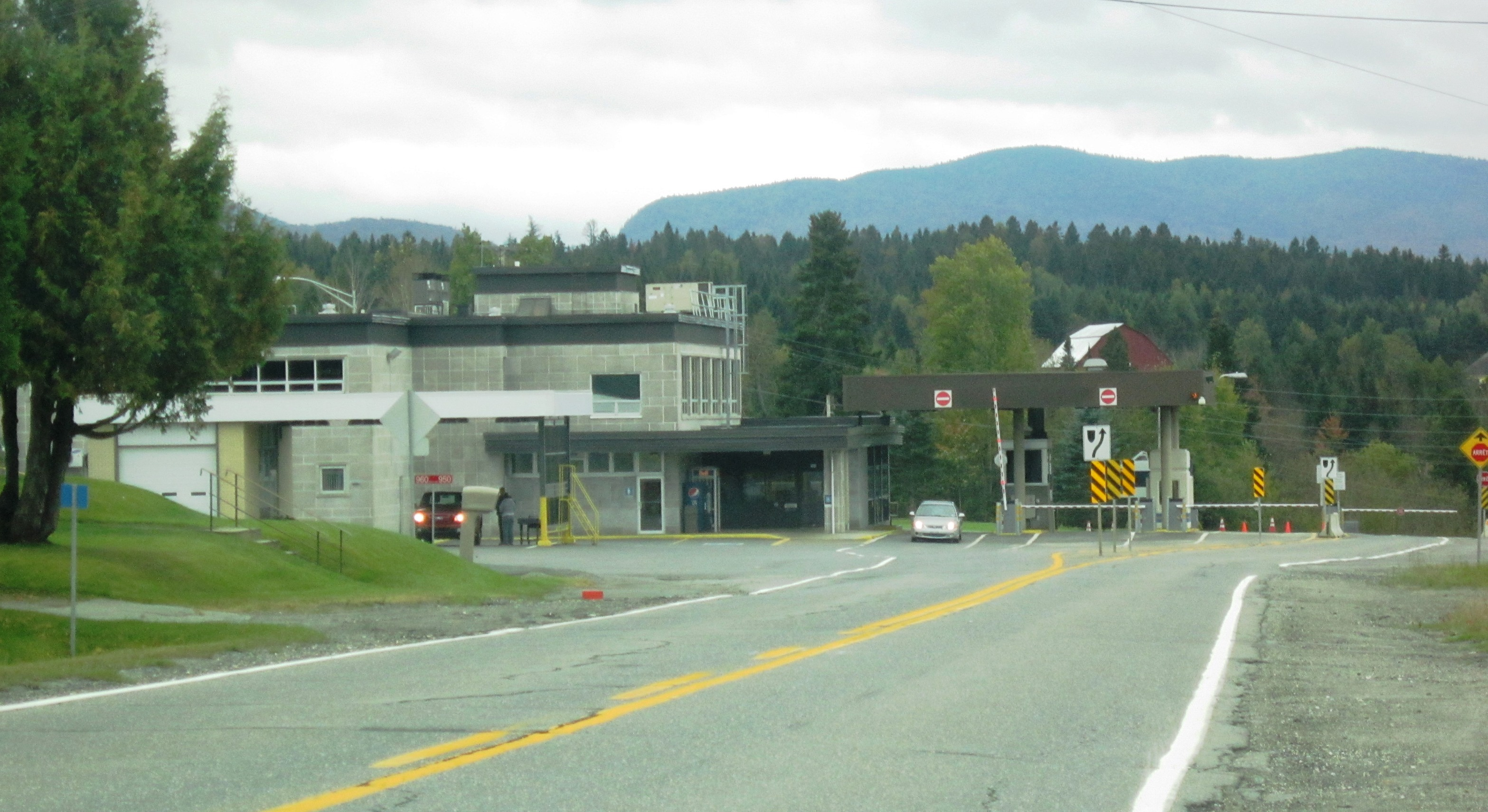
QC 147 at the Norton–Stanhope Border Crossing

QC 147 returns alongside the railroad tracks for a short distance, turning away after Chemin Falconer. The route soon bends northwest through Dixville, soon entering the town of Coaticook. Just after entering Coaticook, QC 147 reaches a junction with QC 141 and become concurrent, running northward as Rue St.-Jacques South. Entering the centre of Coaticook, QC 147 and QC 141 become the main north–south thoroughfare on the east side of the city, a two-lane commercial street. Several blocks north, the routes reach a junction with the western terminus of QC 206 (Rue Main East). At this junction, QC 141 and QC 147 turns west on Rue Main East, running west through the centre of Coaticook. Several blocks west, QC 141 continues west on Rue Main West, while QC 147 turns north on Rue Child.

QC 147 runs northeast for a short distance on Rue Child, turning northwest after Rue Wellington. The route runs along the nearby riverside, slowly leaving Coaticook, and soon bending northeast out of the centre of the city. Now known as the Louis-South-St.-Laurent, QC 147 enters the town of Compton, passing some homes on the east side of the road, bypassing the community of Compton Station and continuing along the riverside. After Compton Station, QC 147 continues north through fields and flats for several kilometers, soon reaching the centre of Compton. In Compton, QC 147 turns northwest and junctions with QC 208 (Chemin de Cochrane). Here, QC 147 and QC 208 runs northwest through the centre of Compton. Only two blocks later, QC 208 turns southwest on Chemin de Hatley. At Chemin de la Station, QC 147 turns north and leaves the centre of Compton.

QC 147 continues north through the fields surrounding Compton, soon turning northeast that parallels a nearby river. Continuing north, the route passes the Club de Golf Milby, entering the town of Sherbrooke. Running along the River aux Saumons, the route turns northwest and entered the town of Waterville, paralleling the river and into a junction with QC 108 and QC 143 (Route Gilbert-Hyatt). This junction marks the northern terminus of QC 147.

== Major intersections ==
County	Location	mi	km	Destinations	Notes
Canada–United States border		0.0	0.0	Norton–Stanhope Border Crossing; roadway continues south as Vermont Route 147	
Coaticook Regional County Municipality	Coaticook	7.8	12.6	R-141 – Saint-Herménégilde	Southern terminus of concurrency with QC 141.
Coaticook Regional County Municipality	Coaticook	9.1	14.6	R-206 (Rue Main East) – Ste-Edwidge	Western terminus of QC 206.
Coaticook Regional County Municipality	Coaticook	9.4	15.1	R-141 (Rue Main West) – Magog	Northern terminus of concurrency with QC 141.
Coaticook Regional County Municipality	Compton	17.3	27.8	R-208 (Chemin de Cochrane) – Martinville, Ste-Edwidge-de-Clifton	Southern terminus of concurrency with QC 208.
Coaticook Regional County Municipality	Compton	17.5	28.2	R-208 (Chemin de Hatley) – Hatley	Northern terminus of concurrency with QC 208.
Coaticook Regional County Municipality	Waterville	25.8	41.5	R-108 / R-143 (Route Gilbert–Hyatt) – Stanstead, Sherbrooke	Northern terminus of QC 147.
1.000 mi = 1.609 km; 1.000 km = 0.621 mi
