= Quebec Route 206 =

Highway in Quebec, Canada

Route 206

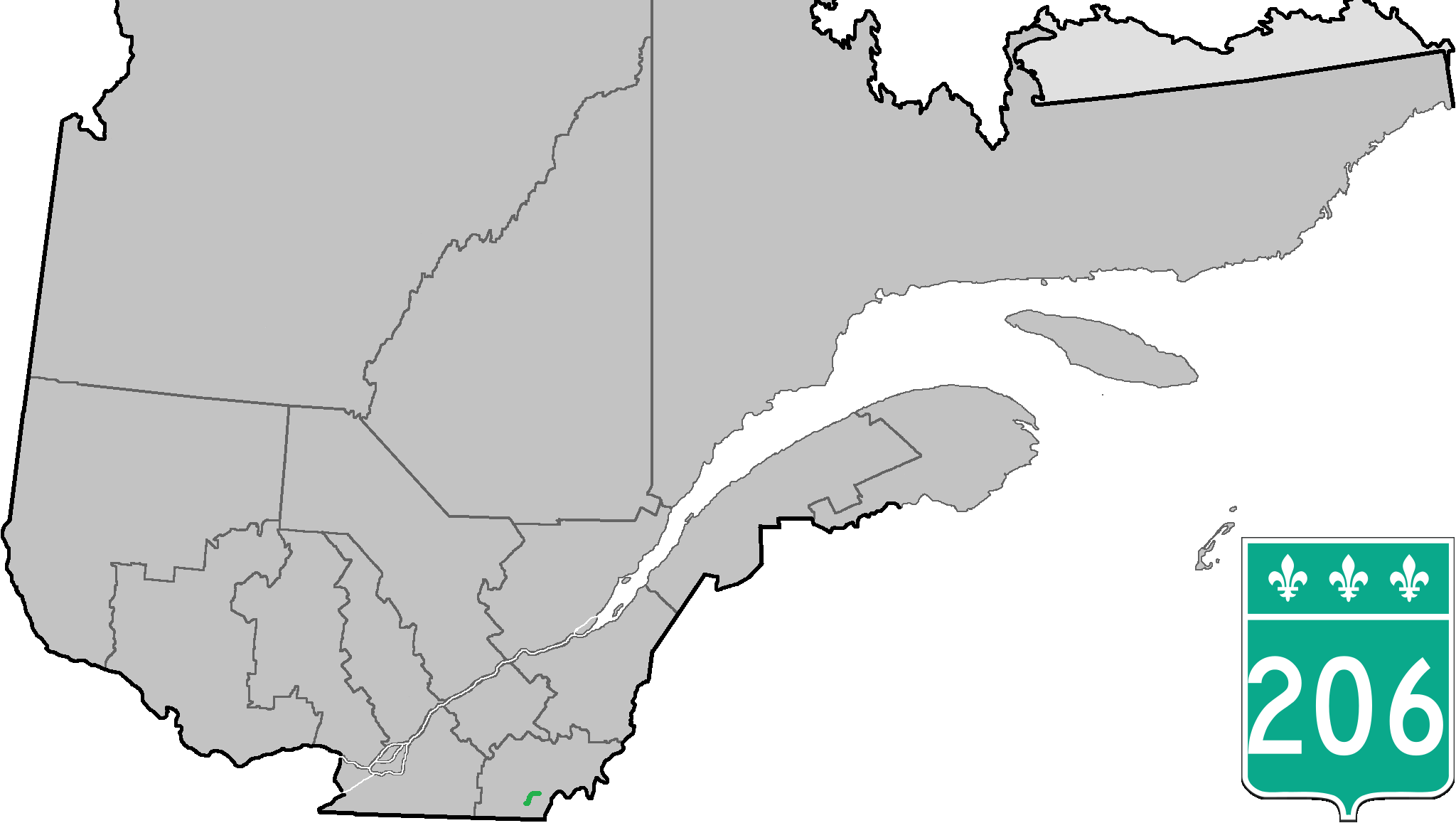

Route information
- Maintained by Transports Québec
- Length: 23.8 km (14.8 mi)

Major junctions
- West end: R-141 / R-147 in Coaticook
- R-251 in Sainte-Edwidge-de-Clifton
- East end: R-253 in Saint-Malo

Location
- Country: Canada
- Province: Quebec

Highway system
- Quebec provincial highways; Autoroutes; List; Former
← R-205	→ R-207

Route 206 is a short provincial highway located in the Estrie region in Quebec. The highway stretches from Route 147 in Coaticook as an east/northeast continuation of Route 141 (which continues southeast towards Dixville) to Route 253 in eastern Saint-Malo via Sainte-Edwidge-De-Clifton. In the latter municipality it briefly overlaps Route 251, which runs to Saint-Herménégilde and Martinville.

== Municipalities along Route 206 ==
- Coaticook
- Compton
- Sainte-Edwidge-De-Clifton
- Saint-Malo

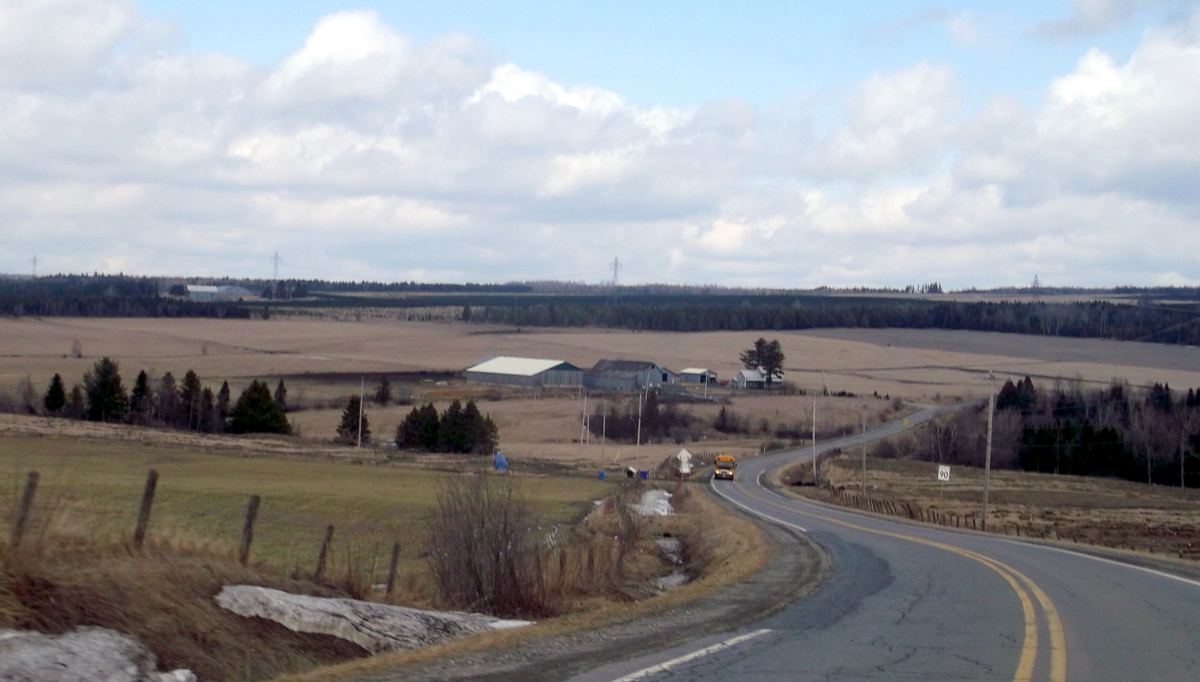
Route 206 in Sainte-Edwidge.

== Major intersections ==
The entire route is in Coaticook RCM.

Location	km	mi	Destinations	Notes
Coaticook	0	0.0	R-141 / R-147 – Dixville, Barnston-Ouest	Southern terminus
Sainte-Edwidge-de-Clifton	15.0	9.3	R-251 north – Martinville	Begin/end concurrency with Route 251
Sainte-Edwidge-de-Clifton	15.7	9.8	R-251 south – Saint-Herménégilde	Begin/end concurrency with Route 251
Saint-Malo	23.8	14.8	R-253 – Saint-Venant-de-Paquette, Saint-Isidore-de-Clifton	Northern terminus
1.000 mi = 1.609 km; 1.000 km = 0.621 mi

== See also ==
- List of Quebec provincial highways
