= Quebec Route 141 =

Highway in Quebec, Canada

Route 141

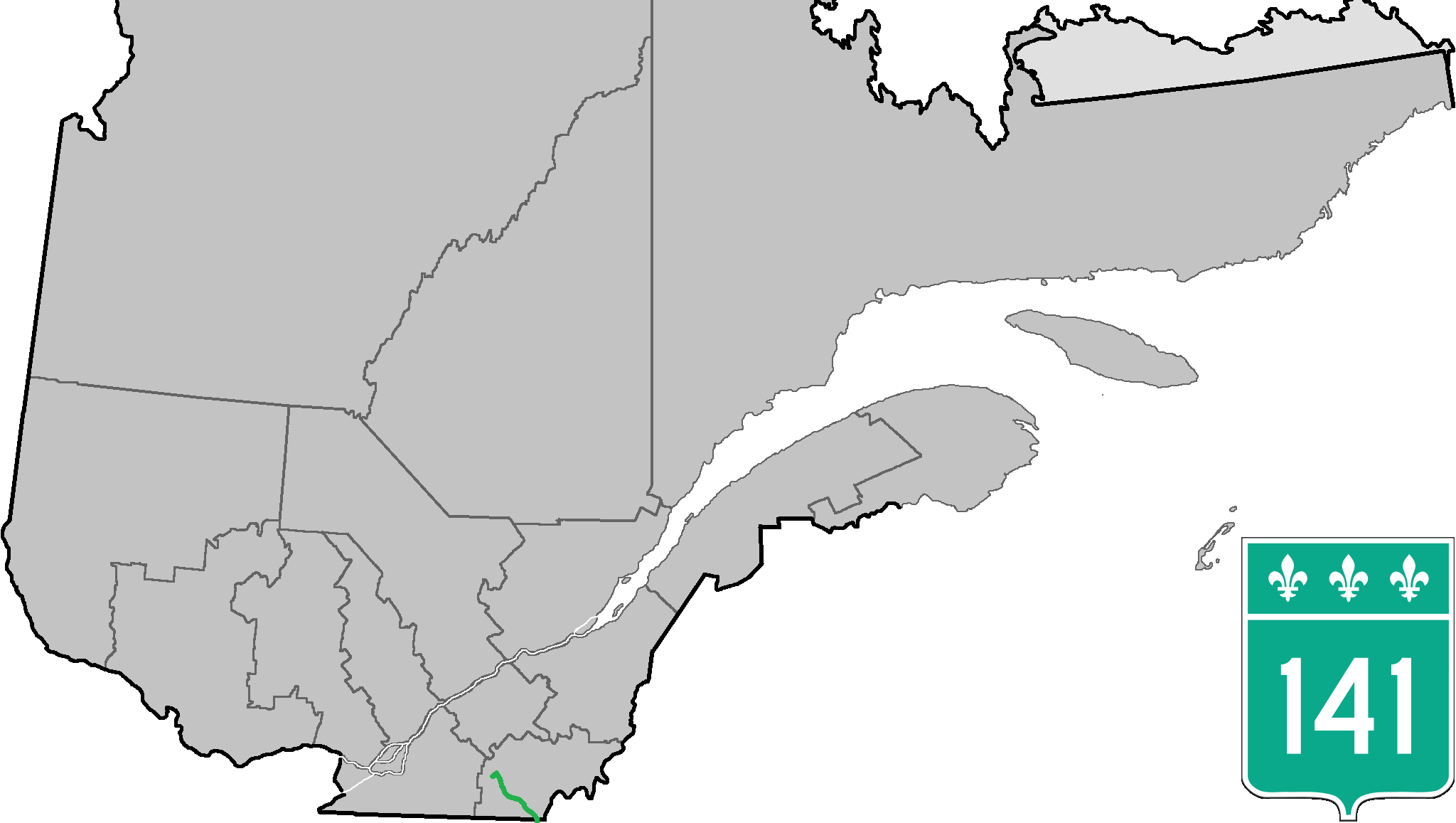

Route information
- Maintained by Transports Québec
- Length: 80.8 km (50.2 mi)

Major junctions
- South end: VT 141 at the U.S. border near Canaan, VT
- R-251 in Saint-Herménégilde; R-147 / R-206 in Coaticook; R-143 / R-208 in Ayer's Cliff; A-55 in Sainte-Catherine-de-Hatley; A-10 / R-108 / R-112 / R-247 in Magog
- North end: A-10 / R-112 in Magog

Location
- Country: Canada
- Province: Quebec
- Major cities: Coaticook, Magog, Orford

Highway system
- Quebec provincial highways; Autoroutes; List; Former
← R-139	→ R-143

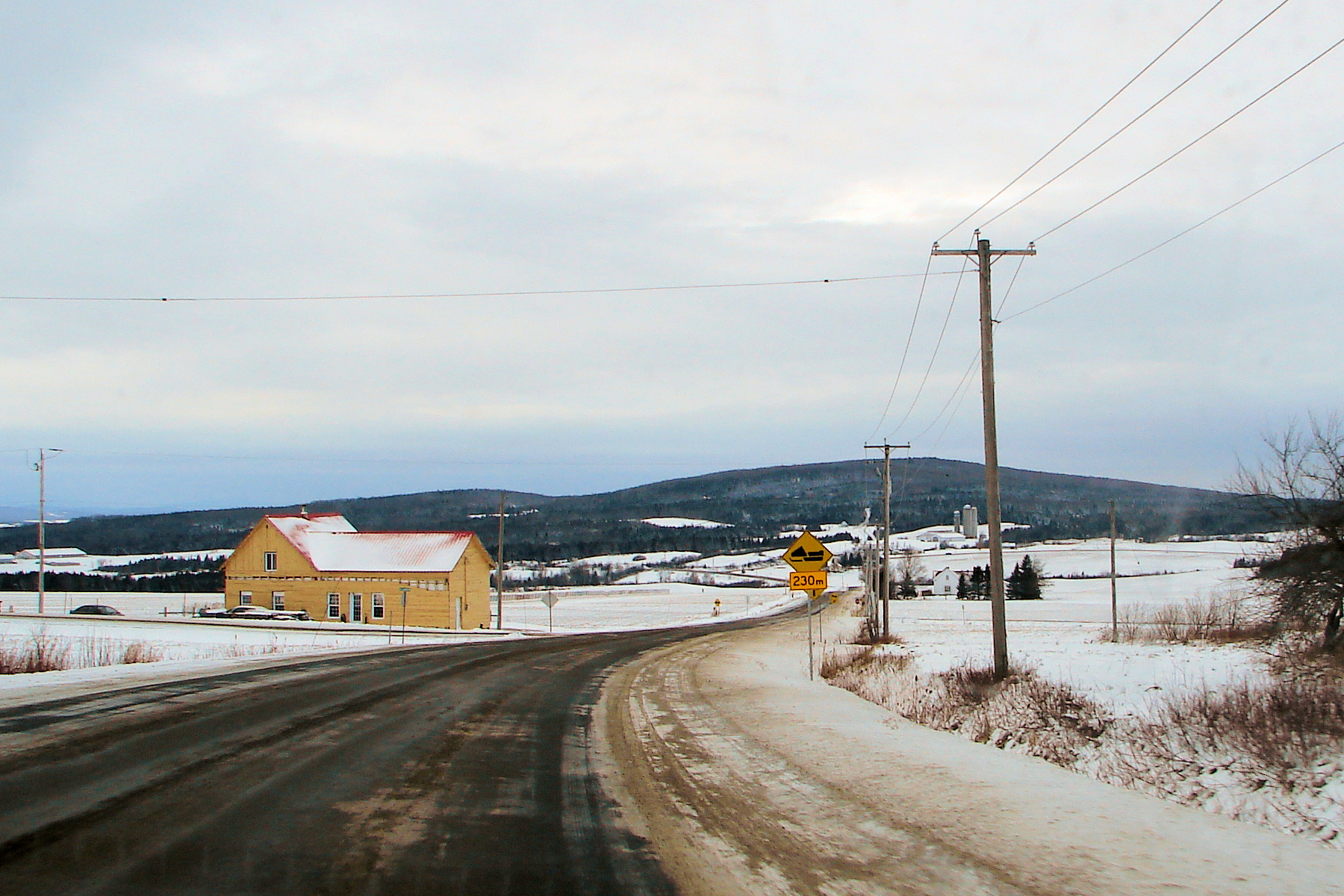
Route 141 at St-Herménégilde

Route 141 is a north/south highway in Quebec on the south shore of the Saint Lawrence River. Its northern terminus is in Magog at the junction of Route 112 and Autoroute 10, and the southern terminus is in Saint-Herménégilde at the United States border in Canaan, Vermont.

== Municipalities along Route 141 ==
- Saint-Herménégilde
- Dixville
- Coaticook
- Barnston-Ouest
- Stanstead-Est
- Ayer's Cliff
- Sainte-Catherine-de-Hatley
- Magog
- Orford

== Major intersections ==
RCM or ET	Municipality	Km	Junction	Notes
Southern terminus of Route 141
Coaticook	Saint-Herménégilde	0.0	VT 141	141 SOUTH: to Canaan, Vermont and VT 114
Coaticook	Saint-Herménégilde	17.7	R-251 (South end)	251 NORTH: to Sainte-Edwidge-de-Clifton
Coaticook	Coaticook	26.0	R-147 (Overlap 2.4 km)	147 SOUTH: to Dixville
Coaticook	Coaticook	27.9	R-206 (West end)	206 EAST: to Sainte-Edwidge-de-Clifton
Coaticook	Coaticook	28.4	R-147 (Overlap 2.4 km)	147 NORTH: to Compton
Memphrémagog	Stanstead-East	47.9	R-143	143 SOUTH: to Stanstead; 143 NORTH: to Hatley
Memphrémagog	Ayer's Cliff	50.4	R-208 (West end)	208 EAST: to Hatley
Memphrémagog	Sainte-Catherine-de-Hatley	54.1; 54.3	A-55	55 NORTH: to Magog; 55 SOUTH: to Stanstead-Est
Memphrémagog	Magog	66.7	R-247 (North end)	247 SOUTH: to Stanstead Township
Memphrémagog	Magog	67.0(*)	R-112	112 WEST: to Austin; 112 EAST: to Sherbrooke
Memphrémagog	Magog	70.2; 70.5	A-10	10 EAST: to Sherbrooke; 10 WEST: to Austin
Memphrémagog	Magog	80.8	A-10 / R-112	112 WEST: to Austin; 112 EAST: to Sherbrooke
Northern terminus of Route 141

== See also ==
- List of Quebec provincial highways
