= Black Turn Brook State Forest =

State Forest in Essex County, Vermont

- Interactive map of Black Turn Brook State Forest
- Type: State forest
- Location: Norton, Essex County, Vermont
- Coordinates: 45.0004°N 71.8175°W
- Area: 592 acres (2.40 km^{2})
- Created: 1994
- Operator: Vermont Department of Forests, Parks, and Recreation
- Website: Website

Black Turn Brook State Forest covers 592 acres (2.40 km^{2}) in Norton, Vermont in Essex County near the Canadian border. The forest is managed by the Vermont Department of Forests, Parks, and Recreation. The parcel is adjacent to the Coaticook River and access is via a right-of-way across privately owned property.

Activities in the forest include hiking, hunting, primitive camping, cross-country skiing and walking.

== History ==
Black Turn Brook State Forest was established in 1994 when the state received 592 acres of land that was formerly known as Earth Peoples Park, which had been seized by the U.S. Government.
