= Stanhope, Quebec =

Stanhope
- Community
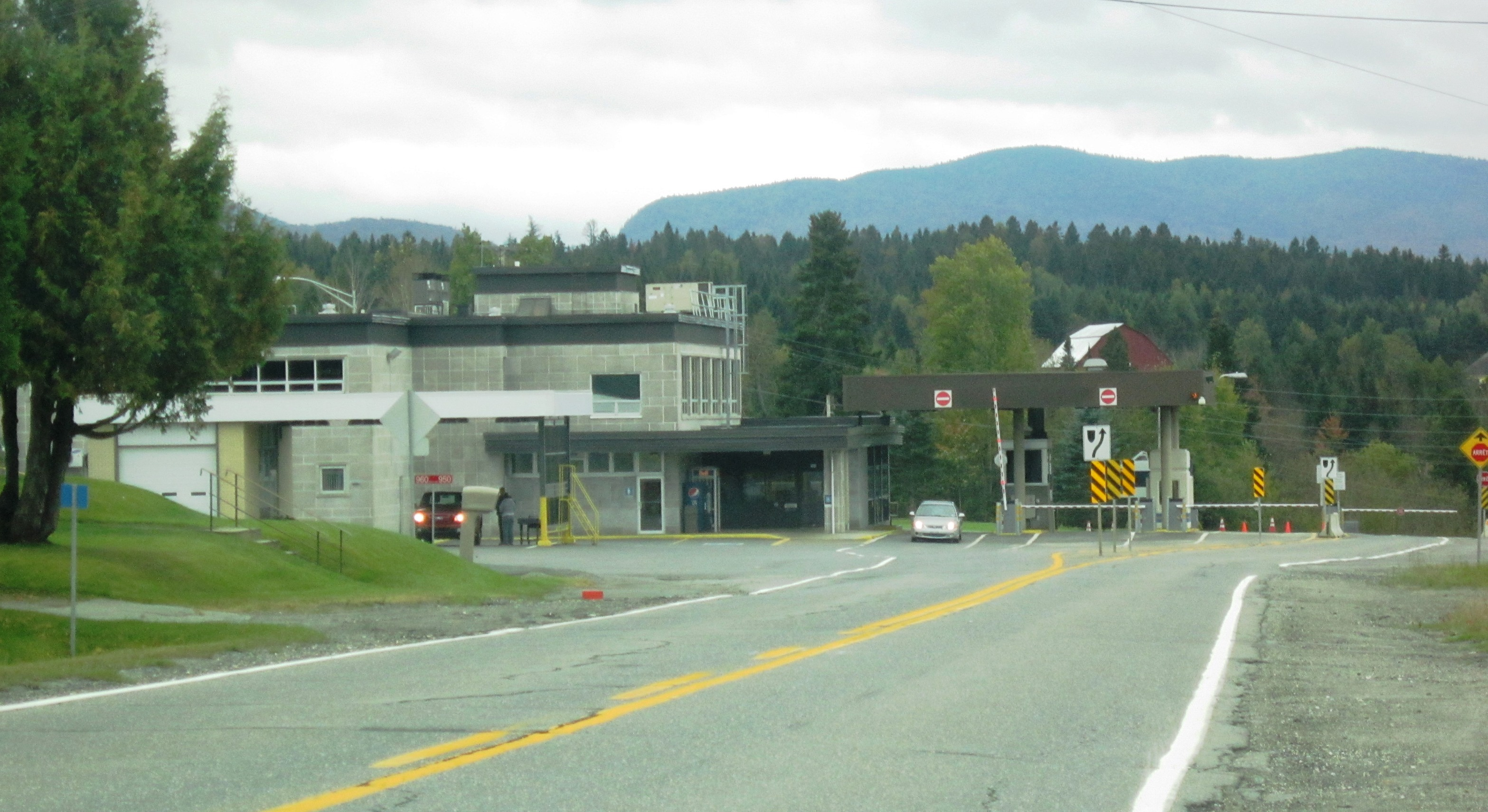
- Stanhope border station

- Location in southern Quebec Stanhope (Southern Quebec)
- Coordinates: 45°00′45.4″N 71°47′54.9″W
- Country: Canada
- Province: Quebec
- Region: Estrie
- RCM: Coaticook
- Municipality: Coaticook
- Elevation: 58 m (190 ft)

Population (2009)
  - Total: 200 (about)
- Time zone: UTC−5 (EST)
  - Summer (DST): UTC−4 (EDT)
- Postal code(s): J1A
- Area code: 819
- Highways: R-147

Stanhope is a Canadian village and community of Coaticook, Coaticook RCM, in the Estrie region of Quebec. Its population is less than 200 residents.

== History ==
The village was a separate community in the 1890s which later became part of Coaticook municipality.

== Geography ==
Located on the Canada–United States border, in front of the town of Norton (Essex County, Vermont); Stanhope spans its residential area on a main road west of the Coaticook River, nearby the Montreal-Sherbrooke-Portland rail. To the east is located the now defunct Stanhope Airport and, on the Quebec Route 147, the border control station.

The village is 6 km far from Dixville, 14 from Coaticook, 24 from Canaan (Vermont), 27 from Stewartstown (New Hampshire), 30 from Brighton (Vermont) and 50 from Sherbrooke.

== Transport ==
The village had a small private airport, is crossed by the Quebec Route 147 and by the St. Lawrence and Atlantic Railroad.

== See also ==
- List of Canada–United States border crossings
