= Earth Peoples Park =

Highest point
- Elevation: 1,275 ft (389 m)
- Coordinates: 45°00.00′N 71°48.65′W

Geography
- Location: Essex County, Vermont
- Topo map: USGS Norton

Earth Peoples Park (1970–1994) was a 592-acre (2.40 km^{2}) parcel of swamp and forested land located in the small Canada–US border village of Norton, Vermont. The park property is now known as Black Turn Brook State Forest, owned by the State of Vermont.

Map of Earth People's Park

== People's Park in Berkeley, California ==
Purchase of the Norton parcel was inspired by the People's Park in Berkeley, California, with some donations for the down payment raised at the 1969 Woodstock Music & Art Festival in Bethel, NY. The Vermont parcel was purchased and managed as a non-profit trust (Earth Peoples Park Inc.), with the land deed officially recorded so as to convey the trusts' "ownership" of the land (the only real asset of the trust), to "all of the peoples of the earth". Due to land surveying errors going back to the settling of that region of the United States and Canada in the late 18th century, the 45th parallel (which was the boundary line set by treaty) actually passes through the acreage several hundred feet to the south of the present-day international boundary vista line, somewhere in the vicinity of the large hay field.

== History ==
In early 1970, the partially logged area, its northern property line running along the international boundary with Canada, as well as prime Coaticook River frontage on the east, was purchased sight-unseen from a 'Strout Realty' mail-order land catalog for $38,000. Criteria included finding as large a property as cheaply as possible, with the remoteness considered a plus (fewer neighbors to bother). It was an unlikely, snow-bound, out of the way location, with little else drawing most folks to that sparsely populated corner of Vermont's Northeast Kingdom, the population of all of Essex County less than 5000 residents at that time.

Unlike the original People's Park in Berkeley, which is owned by the University of California, the underlying principle was that the Vermont trust land would be legally open to anyone who wished to visit, camp, or homestead upon it, rent-free for as long as one desired. The land purchase originally included a separate 1-acre (4,000 m^{2}) parcel nearer town upon which an A-frame was erected as a sort of welcoming center, access at that time was via a shared gravel driveway and through farm fields to the actual land holdings. Locally it became known as 'the last left turn(s) in America', requiring a series of unmarked left turns starting less than 20 feet (6.1 m) south of the US Customs station. Many uninformed visitors often missed the left turn, and suddenly found themselves entering Canada by mistake. In 1974, the shared access was traded for construction of a new, private road leading directly west from State Route 114. The land swap negotiated between the trust and neighboring farmers included construction of a concrete bridge crossing the Coaticook River at the southern edge of the land near Number Six Brook, that access is now known locally as Black Turn Brook Rd.

== Living conditions ==
Living conditions were primitive, particularly in the early years when few permanent structures existed suitable for surviving the harsh winter environment. No utilities such as power, water or telephone ran to the land; heating and cooking was by wood, kerosene or bottled propane, and lighting by candles or kerosene lantern. Drinking and bathing water was drawn from Black Turn Brook, or directly from the Coaticook River. Winter access was particularly challenging; once off the plowed state highway, the unmaintained dirt logging trails were frequently blocked by heavy, drifting snowfall accumulations, adding a half-mile hike in from the highway, with snowshoes, toboggans and cross-country skis much-desired items.

Despite the harsh environment, many people thrived both in the isolation and in their newfound ability to "disconnect" from the noise and distractions of mainstream society, with a number of winter-livable structures added as more people moved in over time. In the period of 1973–75, there were perhaps 25 year-round residents living in dispersed cabins, A-frames, canvas teepees, old school buses, geodesic domes, a 1950s vintage travel trailer, as well as an impressive 8-sided log cabin constructed by one family over the course of several years. Additional living and auxiliary structures were constructed throughout the 1980s.

Warmer months traditionally saw increased visitors, such as summer solstice and fall equinox gatherings, or other word-of-mouth events. The remote location with thickly forested lands included several secluded beaver ponds, along with access to the Coaticook River, providing an idealistic, counter-culture gathering mecca during the short months of summer. Benefit concerts and gatherings took place at the property in an effort to help pay for the property taxes and mortgage payments.

== Legal issues leading to seizure of land by federal government ==
As with much of society throughout the 1970–80s, demographics of park residents changed as well, with many of the earlier (i.e.: long established) 'elders' moving away due to advancing age, declining health, or other personal reasons. Some newer residents were perhaps less 'back to the land' oriented, creating at times problematic situations never envisioned by the land trust created in its vision of a 'free land with no rules' hippy utopia.

Years of intensified government intelligence gathering, coupled with a series of arrests conducted by state and federal law enforcement, led to the seizure of the land by the federal government in October 1990. A pair of park residents purportedly sold ten ounces of park-grown marijuana to an undercover narcotics agent for $500. This event gave the federal government probable cause to seize the land, ultimately evicting everyone still living there, later destroying any structures on the property as well. After drug forfeiture proceedings filed in US District Court (Burlington Vt. 1990) pursuant to 21 U.S.C. Sec. 881(a)(7), the 592 acres (2.40 km^{2}) was eventually conveyed to the State of Vermont for use as publicly owned state forest lands.

Originally destined for sale by the federal government, substantial unique natural resources were discovered, allowing the land to escape sale under an obscure provision in the forfeiture laws. After negotiations with the US Attorney's office state officials, including the office of then-governor Howard Dean, the Vermont Land Trust, and other agencies, an agreement was signed to give the land to the state of Vermont. This respected the park founder's original intention of "public" ownership of the land.

== Land turned over to State of Vermont, now Black Turn Brook State Forest ==
On October 5, 1994, in a ceremony attended by then-Governor of Vermont Howard Dean, Wavy Gravy (Hugh Romney), Ben Cohen (of Ben & Jerry's Ice Cream), along with representatives of other groups, including early park resident Laura Kross (on behalf of Earth Peoples Park Inc.), title to the property was formally transferred to the state. Video of the 1994 ceremony is available on YouTube as well as on Facebook. Today, the former park remains open to recreational visitors for hunting, fishing, and undeveloped hike-in camping activities. It is now shown on area maps as Black Turn Brook State Forest, managed by the Vermont Dept. of Forests and Parks. Presently camping and other recreational activities are permitted under Vermont's "primitive use" camping rules, however, vehicle access from the state highway is restricted, and no permanent structures are permitted.

== Earth Peoples Park land in Del Norte County California ==
During the mid-1970s, the non-profit trust Earth Peoples Park Inc. also purchased a remote 83-acre (340,000 m^{2}) parcel of forest lands situated in Del Norte County, California. Located on Chrystal Mountain within Jedediah Smith Redwoods State Park, that 83-acre (340,000 m^{2}) piece of property apparently remains open to visitors.
