= Norton–Stanhope Border Crossing =

Crossing on the border of Canada and the United States

Norton-Stanhope Border Crossing
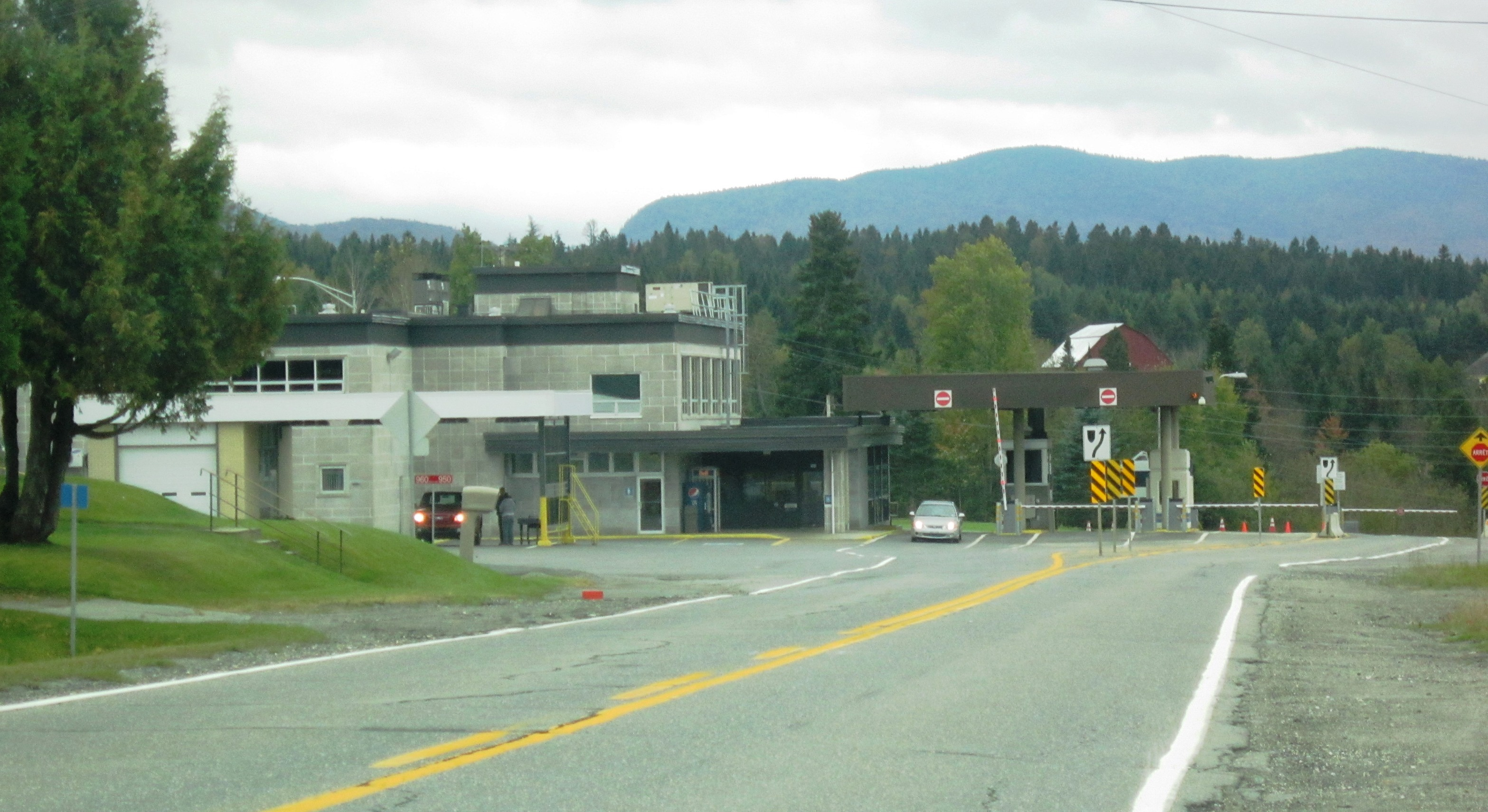
- Canada Border Inspection Station at Stanhope, Quebec

Location
- Country: United States; Canada
- Location: VT 147 / R-147; US Port: 115 Vermont 147, Norton, Vermont 05476; Canadian Port: 1000 Highway 147, Stanhope, Quebec J1A 2S2
- Coordinates: 45.010668°N 71.793487°W

Details
- Opened: 1897

Website
- Official Canadian web site; Official US web site
- U.S. Inspection Station-Norton, Vermont
- U.S. National Register of Historic Places
- MPS: U.S. Border Inspection Stations MPS
- NRHP reference No.: 14000603
- Added to NRHP: September 10, 2014

The Norton–Stanhope Border Crossing connects the towns of Stanhope, Quebec and Norton, Vermont on the Canada–US border. The crossing, at the meeting point of Quebec Route 147 and Vermont Route 147, is the only crossing between the two communities. The US border station, built in 1933, was listed on the National Register of Historic Places in 2014. Both stations are open 24 hours a day.

== Setting ==
The Norton–Stanhope Border Crossing is located in a rural area of northeastern Vermont and southern Estrie. The small Vermont village of Norton lies adjacent to the border, while the immediate border area on the Quebec side is rural, with only the Canadian border stations and farmland nearby. Route 147 runs northwest–southeast, paralleling the Coaticook River, which flows to its west. A railroad line runs north–south across the border between the road and the river, crossing the river in Quebec en route to Sherbrooke.

== Canadian station ==
The Canadian station is located a short way north of the border, on the east side of the road. Across the street is a small duty-free shop. Canada constructed this border station in 1954. Prior to that time, the Canadian border station at this crossing was a two-story gambrel structure. Canada's Federal Heritage Buildings Review Office designated the current facility as a Recognized Federal Heritage Building in 1991.

== United States station ==
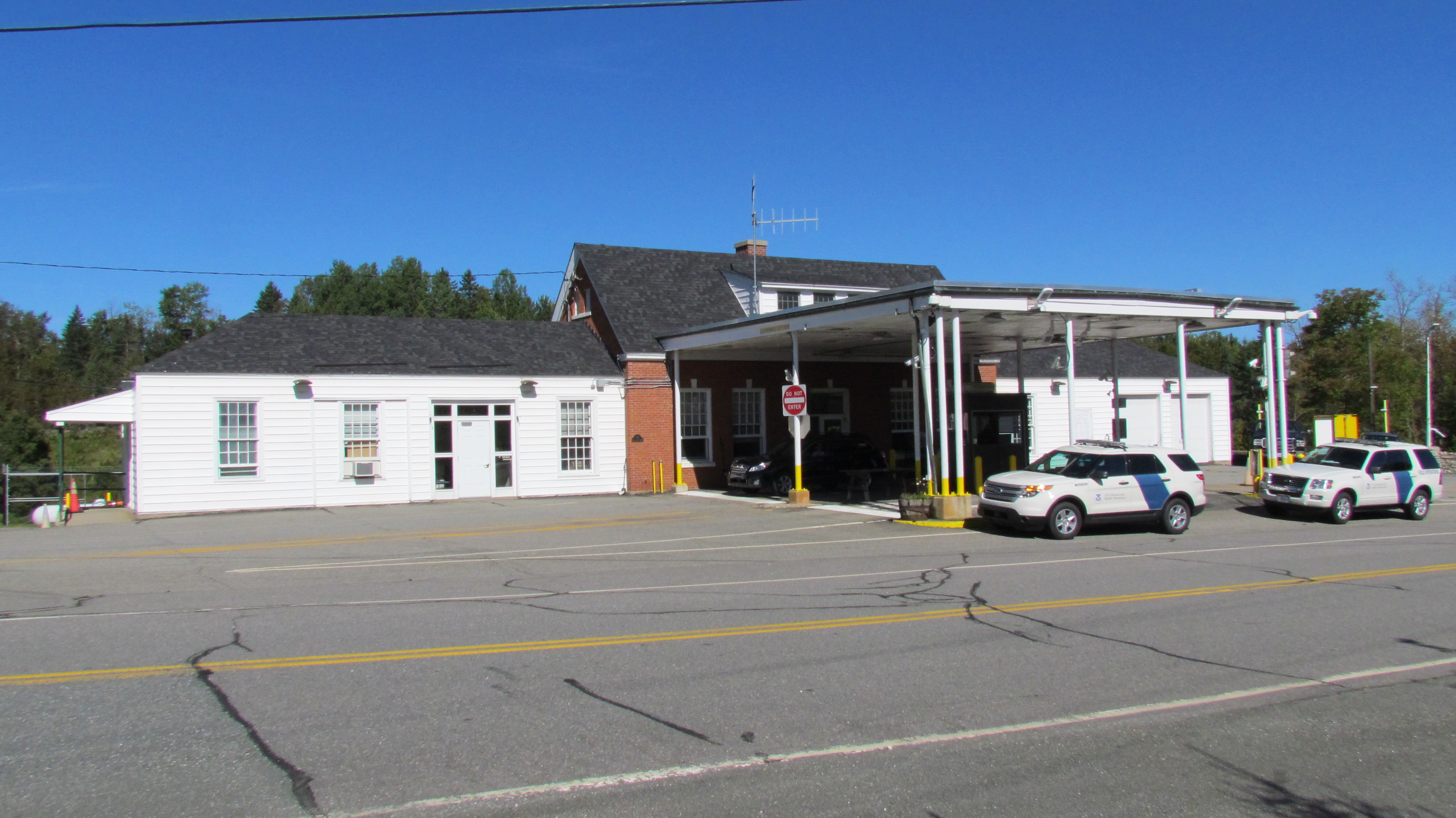
The US border station at Norton VT

The United States station is located on the northwest side of Route 147, on a triangular parcel bounded by the border, the road, and the railroad tracks. It is a 1 1/2-story Colonial Revival brick building, with single-story garage wings extending from both sides. A port-cochere extends across two lanes, providing shelter for arriving vehicles as they are processed. The front facade of the building is five bays wide, and basically symmetrical, with two sash windows on either side of the entrance. The entrance is itself asymmetrical, with a sidelight window on the left side and a transom window above. This is topped by a round-arch brick pattern set in the wall, with a projecting marble keystone. The wings are wood-framed and clad in vinyl siding; that on the left was originally used for customs inspections, but has been converted entirely into office space. Behind the main building is a World War II-era concrete block truck inspection facility.

The station was built in 1933 as part of a major program to improve the nation's border security, brought on by more widespread use of the automobile for travel, smuggling that had increased by Prohibition, and illegal immigration. The conversion of the customs bays to offices was an early alteration, and the port-cochere is a stylistically sympathetic replacement, built to meet requirements for handling higher-clearance vehicles than the original. The stations is one of ten period border stations in the state of Vermont to survive, the most of any state.

== Former second crossing ==
US-Canada border on Nelson Road prior to being barricaded

The towns were originally joined by two roads. Rue Principale in Quebec became Nelson Road in the United States, which winds its way just south of the US station. In 2015 this crossing was blocked with bollards. There once was a general store on the boundary on Rue Principale, which also served liquor during Prohibition in the United States. It featured two cash registers, one on either side of the boundary to serve the customers of each respective country. The building was demolished in 2021.

== See also ==
- List of Canada–United States border crossings
- National Register of Historic Places listings in Essex County, Vermont
