= Quebec Route 208 =

Highway in Quebec, Canada

Route 208

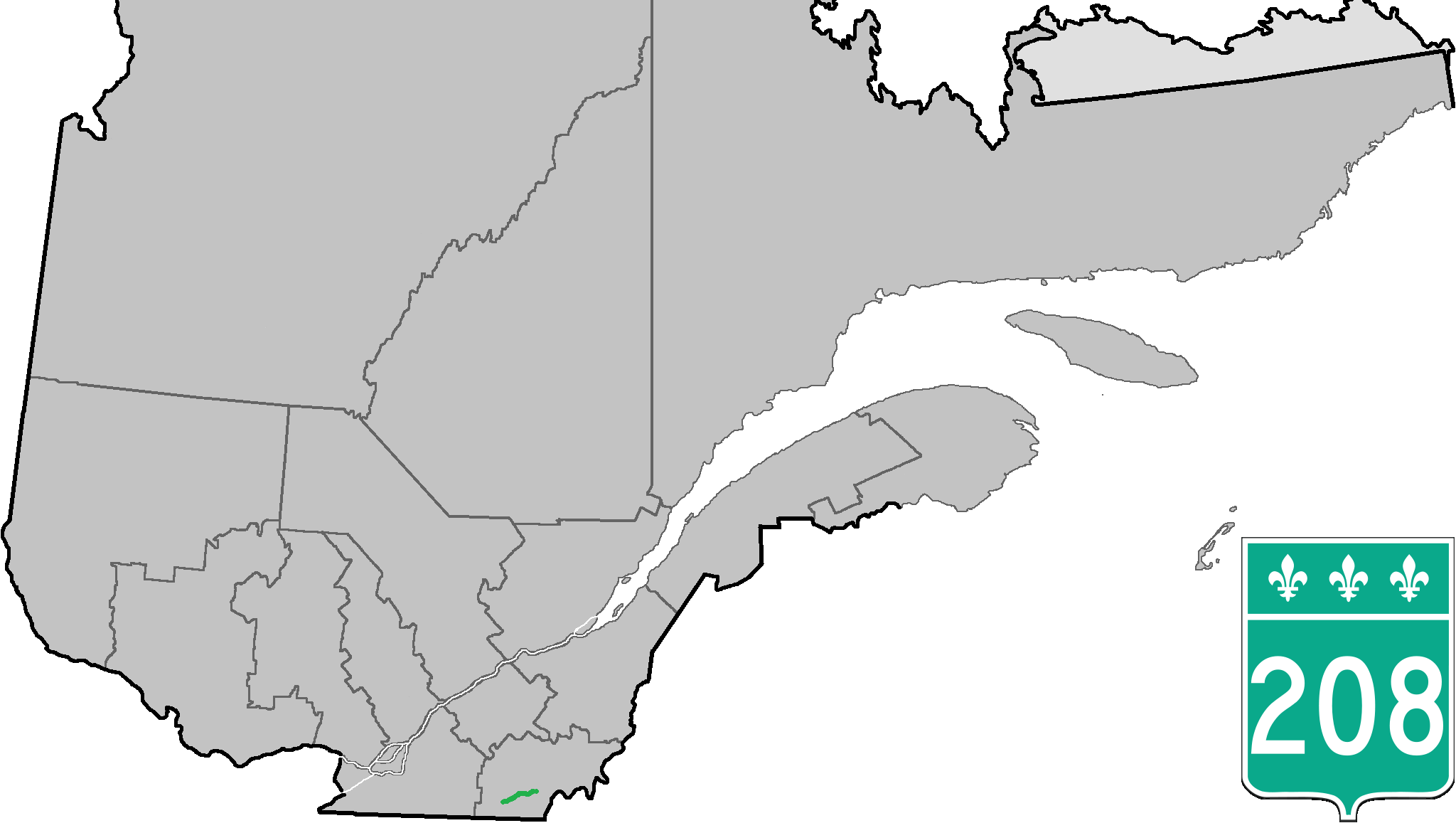

Route information
- Maintained by Transports Québec
- Length: 31.3 km (19.4 mi)

Major junctions
- West end: R-141 in Ayer's Cliff
- R-143 in Hatley; R-147 in Compton
- East end: R-251 in Martinville

Location
- Country: Canada
- Province: Quebec

Highway system
- Quebec provincial highways; Autoroutes; List; Former
← R-207	→ R-209

Route 208 is a provincial highway located in the Estrie region of Quebec, which links Ayer's Cliff to Martinville via Hatley and Compton. In each of these latter cities it briefly overlaps with Route 143 and Route 147 respectively.

== Municipalities along Route 208 ==
- Ayer's Cliff
- Hatley
- Compton
- Martinville
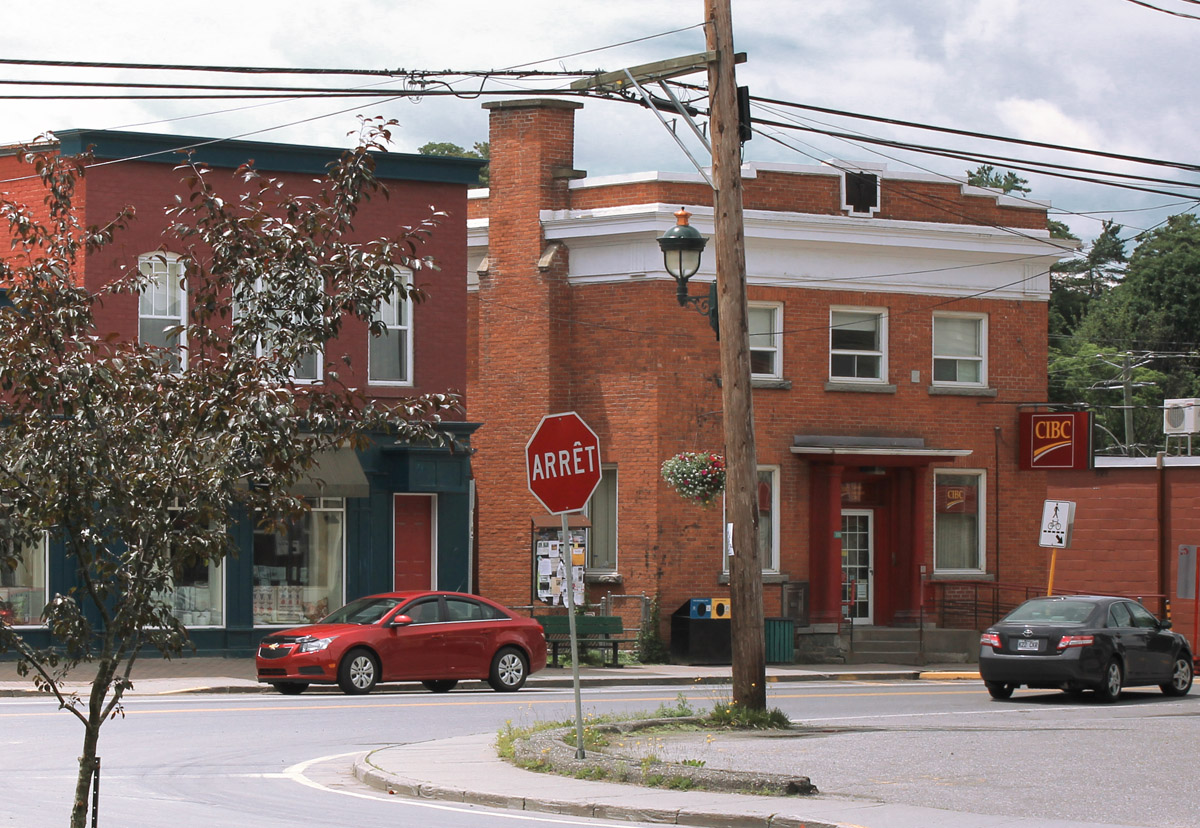
Western end in Ayer's Cliff.

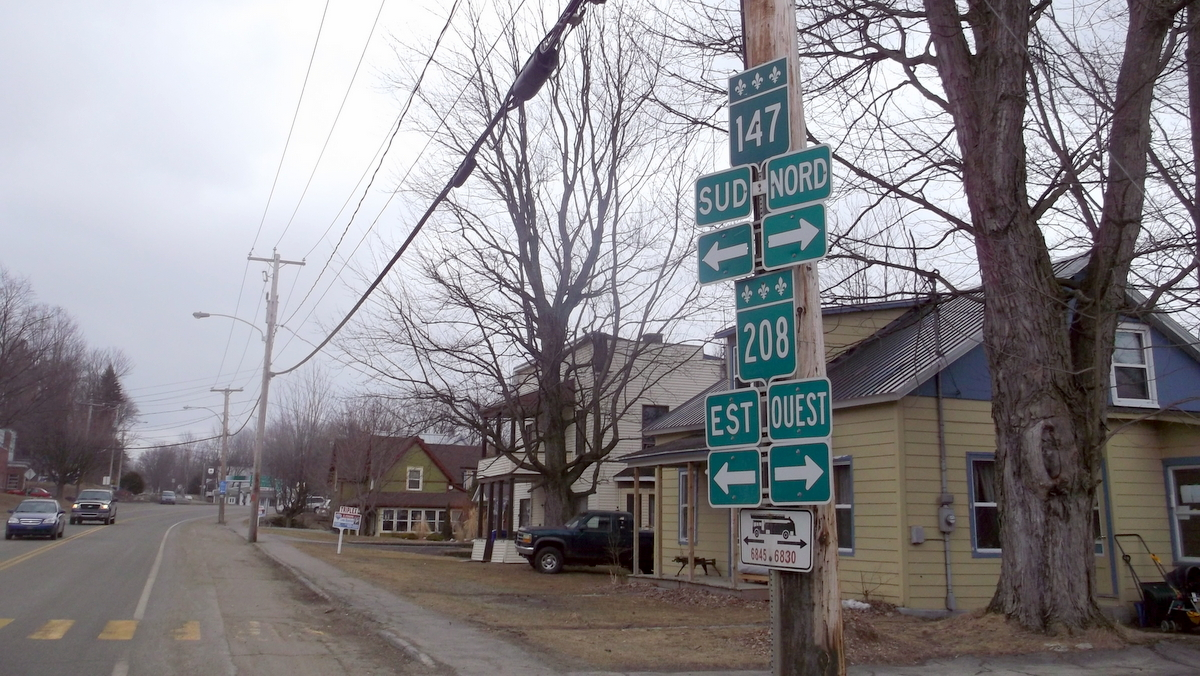
Concurrency with route 147 in Compton.

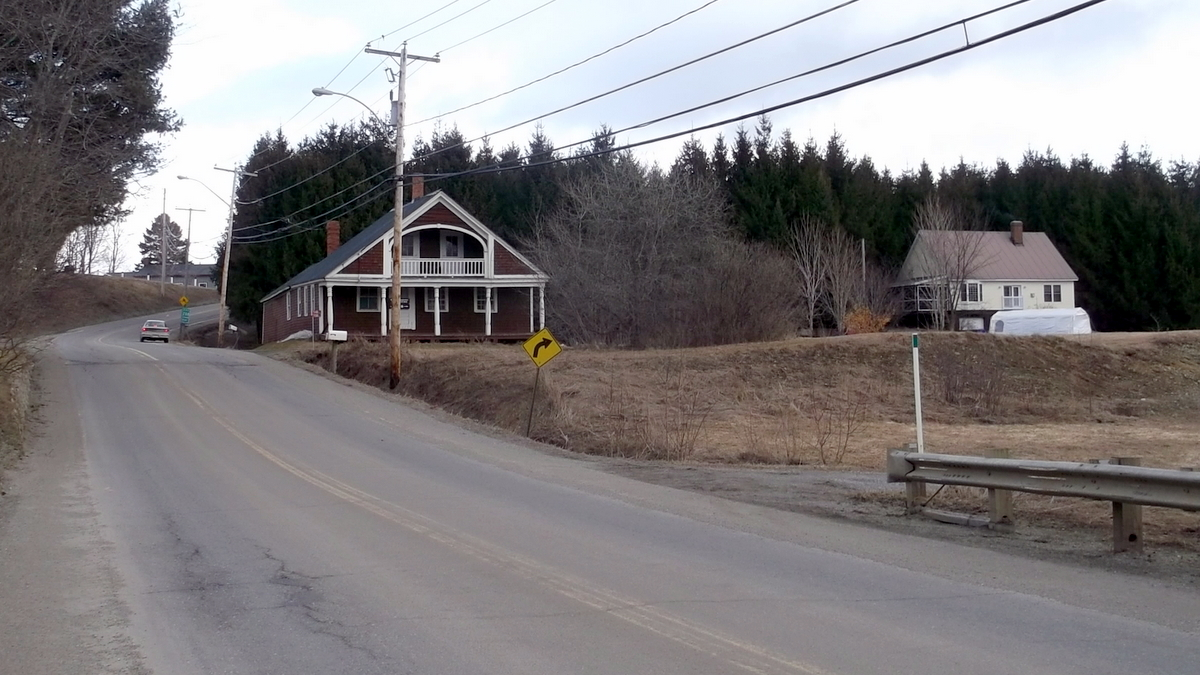
Between Compton and Martinville.

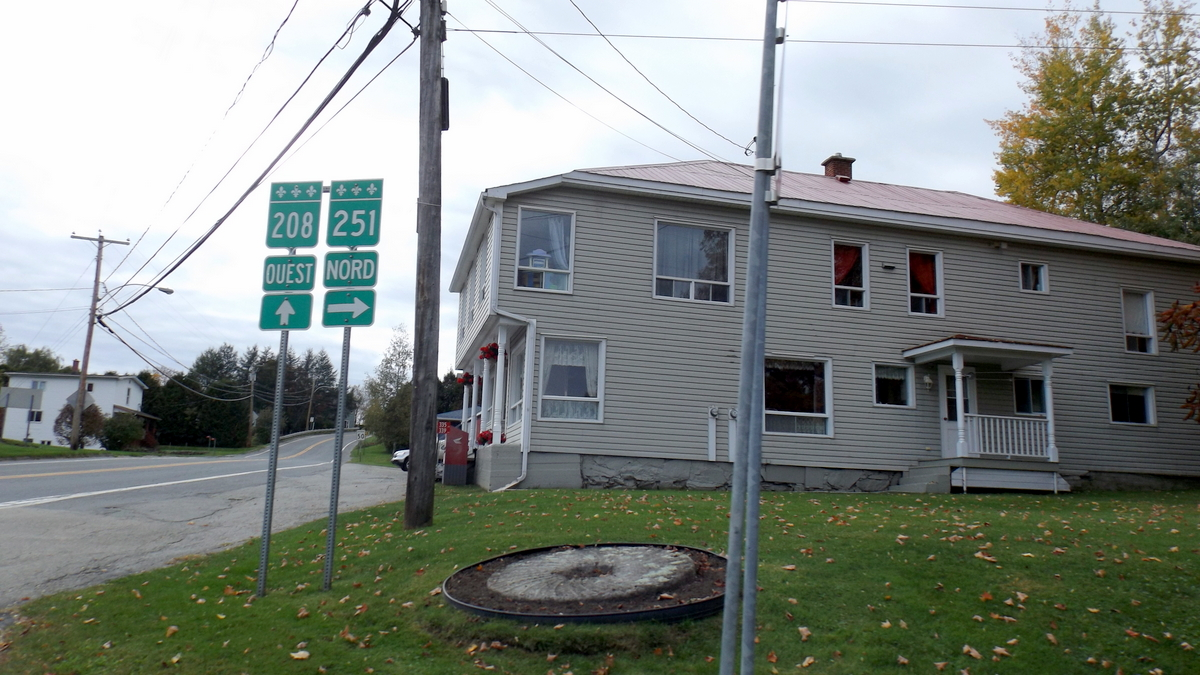
Eastern end in Martinville.

== Major intersections ==
The entire route is in Memphrémagog RCM.

Location	km	mi	Destinations	Notes
Ayer's Cliff	0	0.0	R-141 – Stanstead-Est, Sainte-Catherine-de-Hatley	Western terminus
Hatley Township	4.4	2.7	R-143 west – Stanstead-Est	
Hatley Township	5.0	3.1	R-143 east – Hatley Township	
Compton	20.9	13.0	R-147 north – Waterville	
Compton	21.2	13.2	R-147 south – Coaticook	
Martinville	20.9	13.0	R-251 – Sainte-Edwidge-de-Clifton, Cookshire-Eaton	Eastern terminus
1.000 mi = 1.609 km; 1.000 km = 0.621 mi

== See also ==
- List of Quebec provincial highways
