= Quebec Route 143 =

Highway in Quebec

Route 143

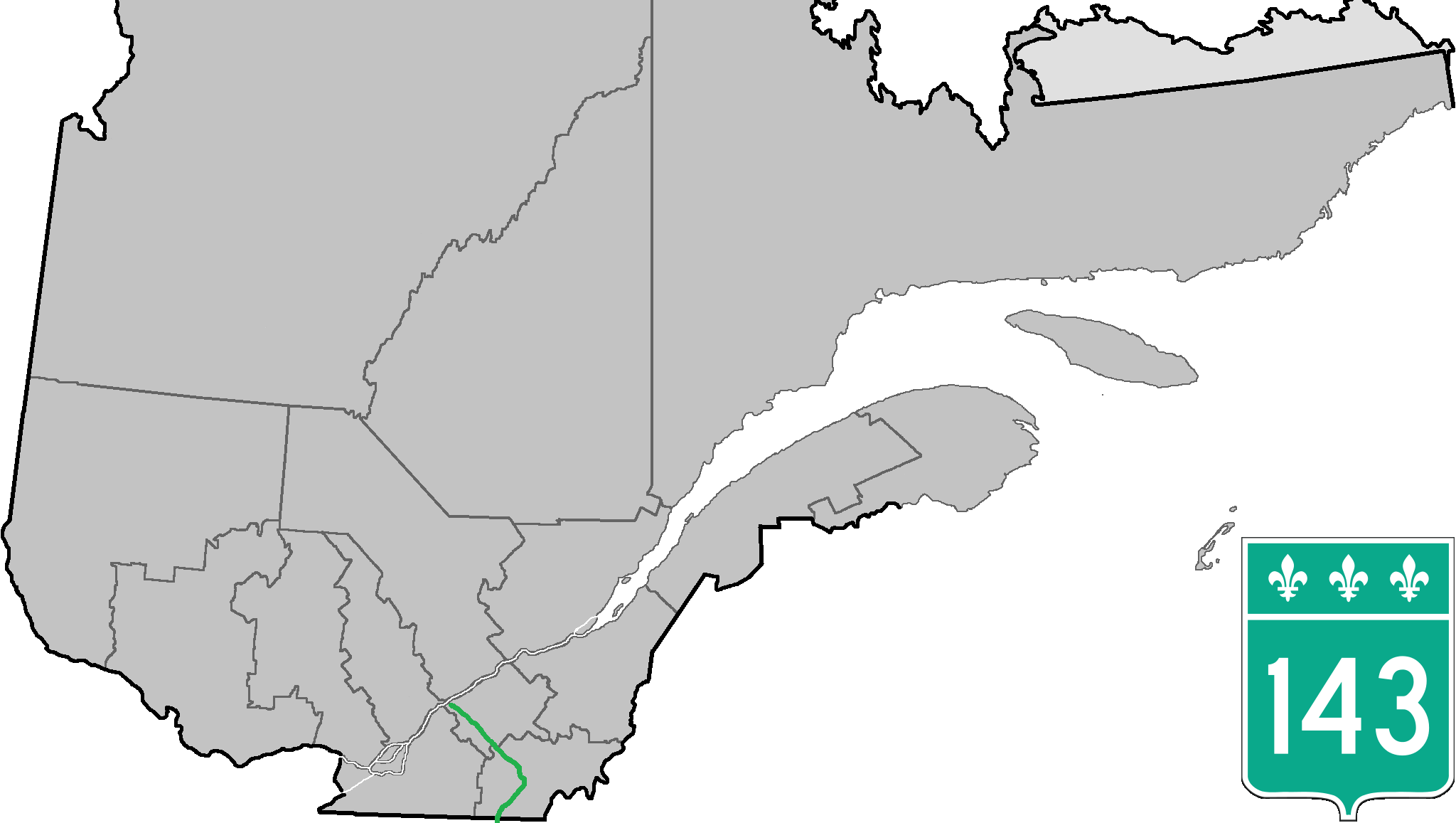

Route information
- Maintained by Transports Québec
- Length: 165.8 km (103.0 mi)

Major junctions
- South end: US 5 at the U.S. border in Stanstead
- R-247 in Stanstead; A-55 / R-141 in Stanstead-Est; R-108 / R-147 in Lennoxville; A-10 / R-112 / R-216 in Sherbrooke; R-222 in Brompton; R-249 in Windsor; R-116 / R-243 in Richmond; R-139 in Saint-Nicéphore; A-20 (TCH) / A-55 / R-122 in Drummondville; R-224 in Saint-Bonaventure
- North end: R-132 in Saint-François-du-Lac

Location
- Country: Canada
- Province: Quebec

Highway system
- Quebec provincial highways; Autoroutes; List; Former
← R-141	→ R-147

Route 143 is a north/south highway on the south shore of the Saint Lawrence River, in the Centre-du-Québec and Estrie regions of Quebec. Until the mid-1970s when the province decided to renumber all highways other than autoroutes, it was known as Route/Highway 5. Its northern terminus is in Saint-François-du-Lac, at the junction of Route 132, and the southern terminus is in Stanstead, at the border with Vermont where the road continues past the Derby Line–Stanstead Border Crossing as U.S. Route 5 through Derby Line to New Haven, Connecticut.

Since Autoroute 55 closely parallels Route 143 for most of its length, much commercial traffic chooses the former. However, it is a very busy route and takes much traffic from the border to the Sherbrooke local area. Route 143 closely follows the Saint-François River between Sherbrooke and Ulverton.

The road is often in notoriously poor condition, since its original cement was laid directly on a gravel road in the mid-1920s. It has been extensively resurfaced to the point the pavement is now more than three feet thick in places, but it heaves extensively at every spring thaw.

== Municipalities along Route 143 ==
- Stanstead
- Stanstead-Est
- Hatley
- Waterville
- Sherbrooke - (Lennoxville / Sherbrooke / Bromptonville)
- Val-Joli
- Windsor
- Cleveland
- Richmond
- Ulverton
- L'Avenir
- Drummondville - (Saint-Nicéphore / Drummondville / Saint-Majorique-de-Grantham)
- Saint-Bonaventure
- Saint-Pie-de-Guire
- Saint-François-du-Lac

== Major intersections ==
RCM or ET	Municipality	Km	Junction	Notes
Southern terminus of Route 143
Memphrémagog	Stanstead	0.0	US 5 south	5 SOUTH: to Derby Line, Vermont
Memphrémagog	Stanstead	0.2; 0.3	R-247	247 NORTH: to Ogden; 247 SOUTH: to A-55
Memphrémagog	Stanstead	2.4; 2.8	A-55	55 SOUTH: to I-91 in Derby Line, Vermont; 55 NORTH: to Stanstead-East
Memphrémagog	Stanstead-East	17.6	R-141	141 NORTH: to Ayer's Cliff; 141 SOUTH: to Barnston-Ouest
Memphrémagog	Hatley	22.0	R-208 (Overlap 0.6 km)	208 WEST: to Ayer's Cliff; 208 EAST: to Compton
Coaticook	Waterville	36.2	Rue Gosselin	EAST: to Waterville
Coaticook	Waterville	40.8	R-108 (Overlap 6.0 km)	108 WEST: to Hatley Township
Coaticook	Waterville	44.1	R-147	147 SOUTH: to Compton
Sherbrooke	Lennoxville	46.8	R-108 (Overlap 6.0 km)	108 EAST: to Eaton
Sherbrooke	Sherbrooke	50.8	R-216	216 WEST: to Magog; 216 EAST: to Stoke
Sherbrooke	Sherbrooke	51.9	R-112	112 WEST: to Rock Forest (Sherbrooke); 112 EAST: to Fleurimont (Sherbrooke)
Sherbrooke	Bromptonville	58.3	R-222 (East end)	222 WEST: to Saint-Denis-de-Brompton
Sherbrooke	Bromptonville	61.8	Rue Laval	WEST: to A-55
Le Val-Saint-François	Windsor	74.7	R-249	249 SOUTH: to Saint-François-Xavier-de-Brompton; 249 NORTH: to Val-Joli
Le Val-Saint-François	Richmond	90.2	R-116 (Overlap 1.9 km)	116 EAST: to Cleveland
Le Val-Saint-François	Richmond	91.3	R-243 (Overlap 1.1 km)	243 NORTH: to Saint-Félix-de-Kingsey
Le Val-Saint-François	Richmond	92.1	R-116 (Overlap 1.9 km)	116 WEST: to Durham-Sud
Le Val-Saint-François	Richmond	92.4	R-243 (Overlap 1.1 km)	243 SOUTH: to Melbourne
Drummond	Saint-Nicéphore	120.6	R-139 (North end)	139 SOUTH: to Wickham
Drummond	Drummondville	129.2; 129.5	R-122 (Overlap 0.3 km)	122 EAST: to Saint-Charles-de-Drummond (Drummondville); 122 WEST: to Saint-Germain-de-Grantham (Drummondville)
Drummond	Drummondville	131.9; 132.2	A-20 (TCH)	20 EAST: to Saint-Cyrille-de-Wendover; 20 WEST: to Saint-Eugène
Drummond	Saint-Bonaventure	148.8	R-224 (East end)	224 WEST: to Saint-Guillaume
Nicolet-Yamaska	Saint-François-du-Lac	165.8	R-132	132 WEST: to Saint-Gérard-Majella; 132 EAST: to Pierreville
Northern terminus of Route 143

== See also ==
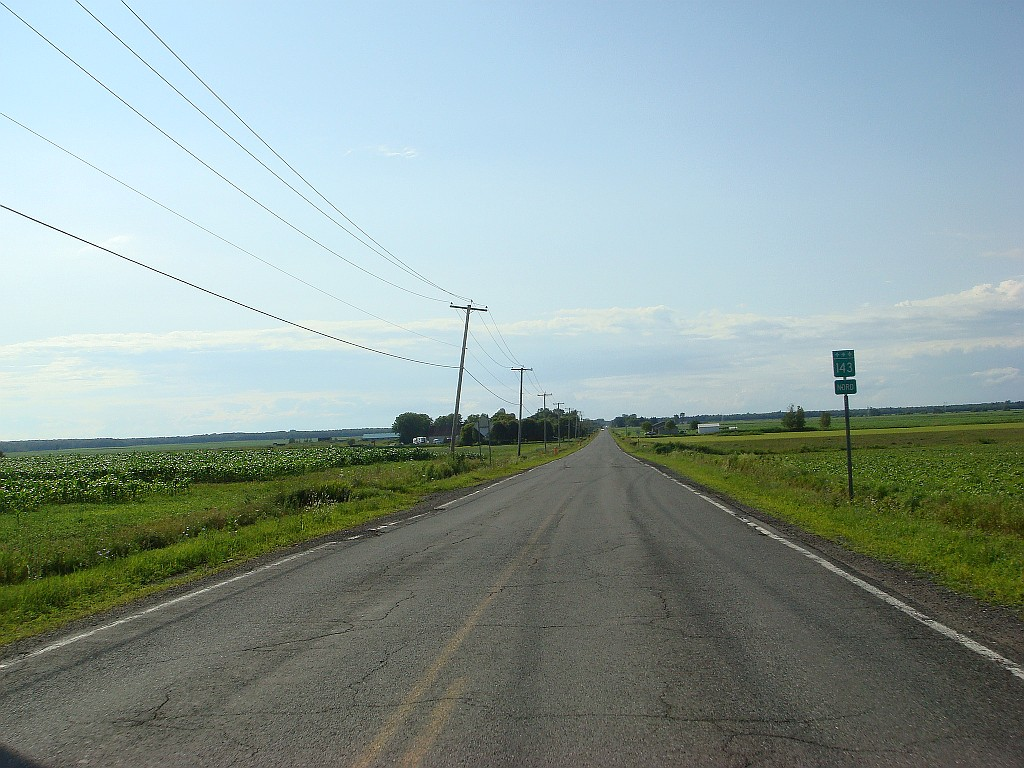
Route 143 near Saint-Bonaventure, Quebec

- List of Quebec provincial highways
