= Quebec Route 207 =

Highway in Quebec, Canada

Route 207

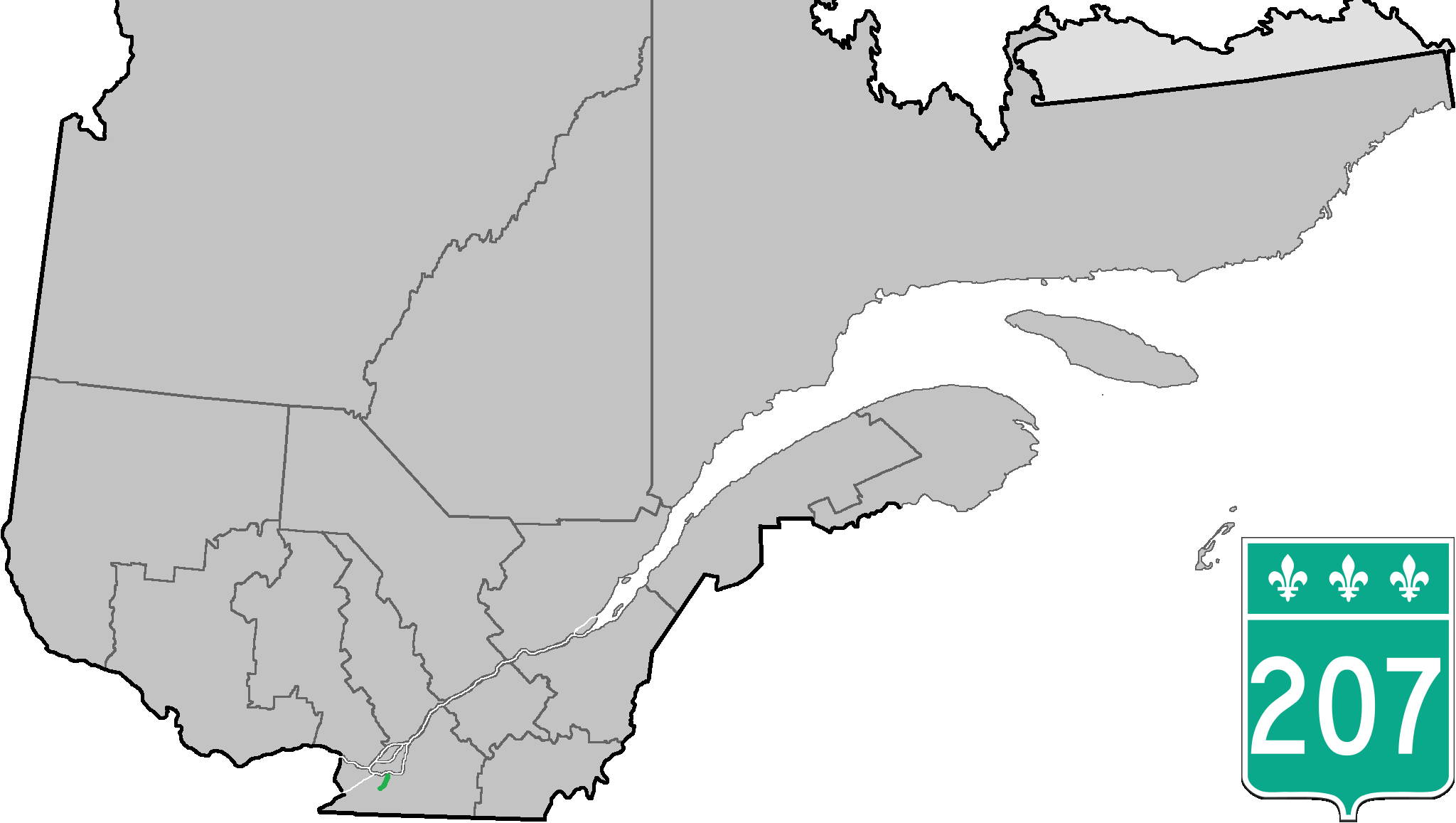

Route information
- Maintained by Transports Québec
- Length: 23.1 km (14.4 mi)

Major junctions
- South end: R-205 in Saint-Urbain-Premier
- R-221 in Saint-Isidore; A-30 in Saint-Constant
- North end: R-132 / R-138 in Kahnawake

Location
- Country: Canada
- Province: Quebec

Highway system
- Quebec provincial highways; Autoroutes; List; Former
← R-206	→ R-208

Route 207 is a provincial highway located in the Montérégie region of Quebec. The highway starts at the junction of Route 205 in Saint-Urbain-Premier and ends northeast at the junctions of Route 132 and Route 138 just south of the Mercier Bridge at the Kahnawake Mohawk Reserve, southwest of the island of Montreal.

== Municipalities along Route 207 ==
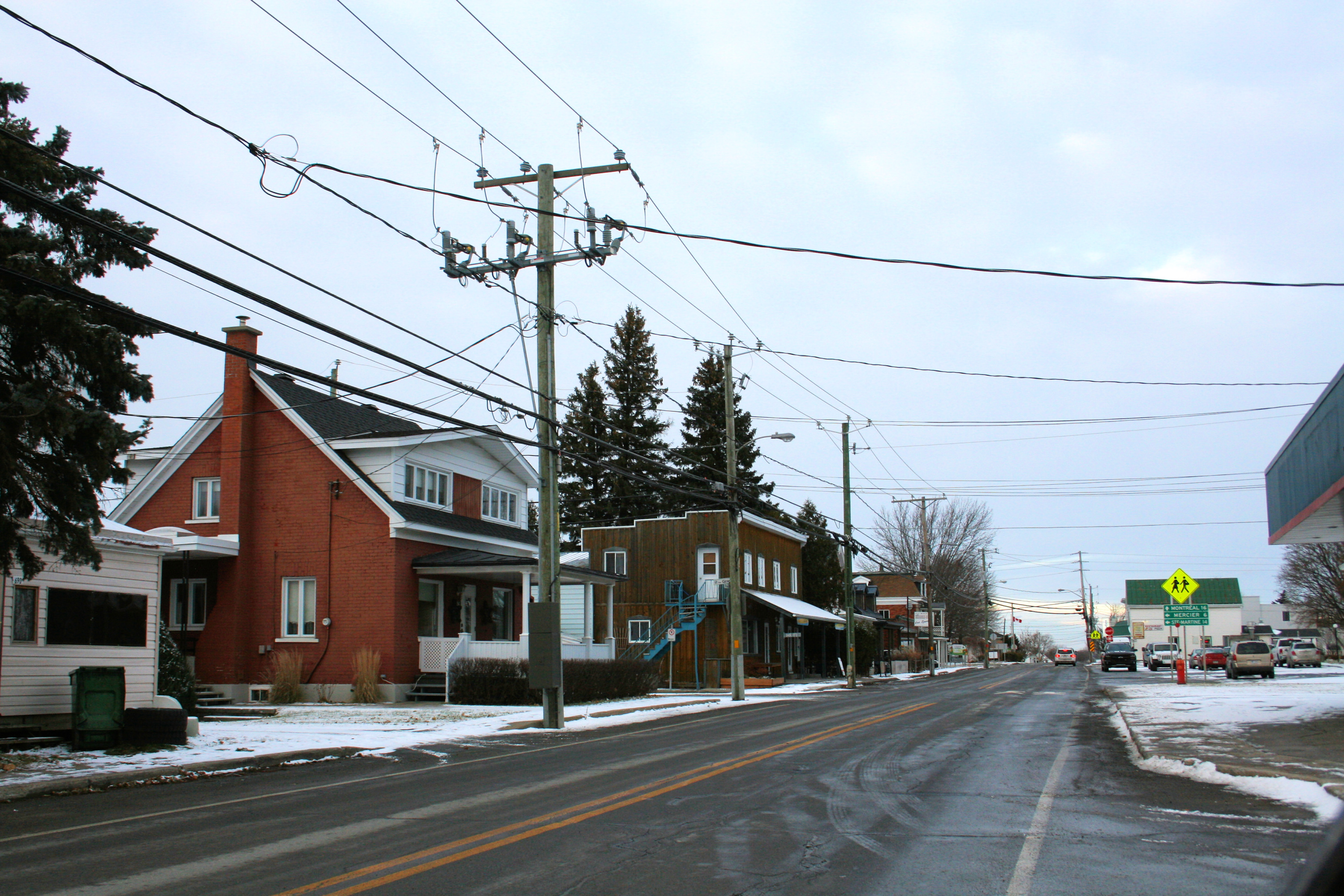
Route 207 at St-Isidore

- Saint-Urbain-Premier
- Saint-Isidore
- Saint-Constant
- Kahnawake

== Major intersections ==
RCM or ET	Municipality	Km	Junction	Notes
Southern terminus of Route 207
Beauharnois-Salaberry	Saint-Urbain-Premier	0.0	R-205	205 SOUTH: to Sainte-Clotilde; 205 NORTH: to Sainte-Martine
Roussillon	Saint-Isidore	8.9	Montée Saint-Thérèse	EAST: to Saint-Rémi
Roussillon	Saint-Isidore	16.2	R-221	221 SOUTH: to Saint-Rémi
Roussillon	Saint-Constant	17.0; 17.1	A-30	30 EAST: to Sainte-Catherine; 30 WEST: to Châteauguay
Roussillon	Kahnawake	22.9	R-132 / R-138	132 EAST: to Sainte-Catherine; 138 EAST: to Montreal
Roussillon	Kahnawake	23.1	R-132 / R-138	132/138 WEST: to Châteauguay
Northern terminus of Route 207

== See also ==
- List of Quebec provincial highways
