= Coaticook Regional County Municipality =

Coaticook
- Regional county municipality
- Coordinates: 45°08′N 71°48′W
- Country: Canada
- Province: Quebec
- Region: Estrie
- Effective: January 1, 1982
- County seat: Coaticook

Government
  - Type: Prefecture
  - Prefect: Bernard Marion

Area
  - Total: 1,354.70 km^{2} (523.05 sq mi)
  - Land: 1,339.80 km^{2} (517.30 sq mi)

Population (2016)
  - Total: 18,497
  - Density: 13.8/km^{2} (36/sq mi)
  - Change 2011-2016: ▼1.9%
- Time zone: UTC−5 (EST)
  - Summer (DST): UTC−4 (EDT)
- Area code: 819
- Website: www.mrcdecoaticook.qc.ca

Coaticook is a regional county municipality in the Estrie region of Quebec, Canada. The seat is Coaticook.

== History ==
On September 3, 1783, as a result of the signing of the Treaty of Paris the American Revolutionary War ended with Great Britain. Quebec's border with the states of Vermont and New Hampshire was established at 45 degrees north latitude.

== Subdivisions ==
There are 12 subdivisions within the RCM:

Cities & Towns (2)

- Coaticook
- Waterville

Municipalities (9)

- Barnston-Ouest
- Compton
- Dixville
- East Hereford
- Martinville
- Saint-Herménégilde
- Saint-Malo
- Saint-Venant-de-Paquette
- Stanstead-Est

Townships (1)

- Sainte-Edwidge-de-Clifton

== Demographics ==
Mother tongue data from Canada 2016 Census

Language	Population	Pct (%)
French only	16,055	87.7%
English only	1,850	10.1%
Both English and French	185	1.0%
Other languages	215	1.2%

== Transportation ==
=== Access Routes ===
Highways and numbered routes that run through the municipality, including external routes that start or finish at the county border:

- Autoroutes
  - A-55
- Principal Highways
  - R-141
  - R-143
  - R-147
- Secondary Highways
  - R-206
  - R-208
  - R-251
  - R-253
- External Routes
  - VT 114
  - VT 141
  - VT 253

== See also ==
- List of regional county municipalities and equivalent territories in Quebec
