= Norton, Vermont =

- Town
- Location in Essex County and the state of Vermont
- Coordinates: 44°59′25″N 71°49′58″W
- Country: United States
- State: Vermont
- County: Essex
- Communities: Norton; Averill; Lake

Area
  - Total: 39.6 sq mi (102.6 km^{2})
  - Land: 39.2 sq mi (101.5 km^{2})
  - Water: 0.42 sq mi (1.1 km^{2})
- Elevation: 1,375 ft (419 m)

Population (2020)
  - Total: 153
  - Density: 3.9/sq mi (1.5/km^{2})
- Time zone: UTC-5 (EST)
  - Summer (DST): UTC-4 (EDT)
- ZIP code: 05907
- Area code: 802
- FIPS code: 50-52750
- GNIS feature ID: 1462165

Norton is a town in Essex County, Vermont, United States. The population was 153 at the 2020 census. It is part of the Berlin, NH –VT Micropolitan Statistical Area. It is located on the Canada–US border immediately south of Stanhope, Quebec.

== History ==
From 1970 until 1994, Norton was the location of the Earth Peoples Park, a "liberated" 592-acre (240 ha) piece of land that was open to anyone who wanted to live there, free of charge. In 1994 it was taken over by the state of Vermont and is now Black Turn Brook State Forest.

== Geography ==
Norton is in the northeast corner of Vermont, bordered to the west by Orleans County, Vermont, and to the north by the Canadian province of Quebec. Vermont Route 114 crosses the center of the town from Norton Pond in the south to the village of Norton in the north next to the Canada–US border, at which point the highway turns east toward Averill and Canaan, Vermont. The south–north portion of the highway follows the valley of the Coaticook River, which flows from Norton Pond north into Quebec, where its water travels via the Massawippi and Saint-François rivers to the Saint Lawrence River.

According to the United States Census Bureau, the town of Norton has a total area of 39.6 square miles (102.6 km^{2}), of which 39.2 square miles (101.5 km^{2}) is land and 0.42 square miles (1.1 km^{2}), or 1.04%, is water. The highest point in town is 2,723-foot (830 m) Brousseau Mountain near the eastern border.

== Demographics ==
Historical population
Census	Pop.	Note	%±
1860	32		—
1870	303		846.9%
1880	239		−21.1%
1890	960		301.7%
1900	692		−27.9%
1910	479		−30.8%
1920	336		−29.9%
1930	339		0.9%
1940	314		−7.4%
1950	279		−11.1%
1960	241		−13.6%
1970	207		−14.1%
1980	184		−11.1%
1990	169		−8.2%
2000	214		26.6%
2010	169		−21.0%
2020	153		−9.5%
U.S. Decennial Census

As of the census of 2000, there were 214 people, 91 households, and 51 families residing in the town. The population density was 5.5 inhabitants per square mile (2.1/km^{2}). There were 252 housing units at an average density of 6.5 per square mile (2.5/km^{2}). The racial makeup of the town was 96.73% White, 2.34% Native American, and 0.93% from two or more races. According to the 2000 Census, 26.9% of the households in Norton speak French at home, reflecting the town's location at the Québec border.

There were 91 households, out of which 26.4% had children under the age of 18 living with them, 52.7% were married couples living together, 3.3% had a female householder with no husband present, and 42.9% were non-families. 30.8% of all households were made up of individuals, and 15.4% had someone living alone who was 65 years of age or older. The average household size was 2.35 and the average family size was 3.15.

In the town, the population was spread out, with 24.3% under the age of 18, 5.6% from 18 to 24, 23.8% from 25 to 44, 28.0% from 45 to 64, and 18.2% who were 65 years of age or older. The median age was 43 years. For every 100 females, there were 98.1 males. For every 100 females age 18 and over, there were 116.0 males.

The median income for a household in the town was $20,000, and the median income for a family was $25,000. Males had a median income of $32,188 versus $20,417 for females. The per capita income for the town was $15,506. None of the families and 14.6% of the population were living below the poverty line, including no one under 18, and 21.1% of those over 64.

== See also ==
- Stanhope, Quebec
- Norton–Stanhope Border Crossing
