= Saint-Malo, Quebec =

Saint-Malo
- Municipality
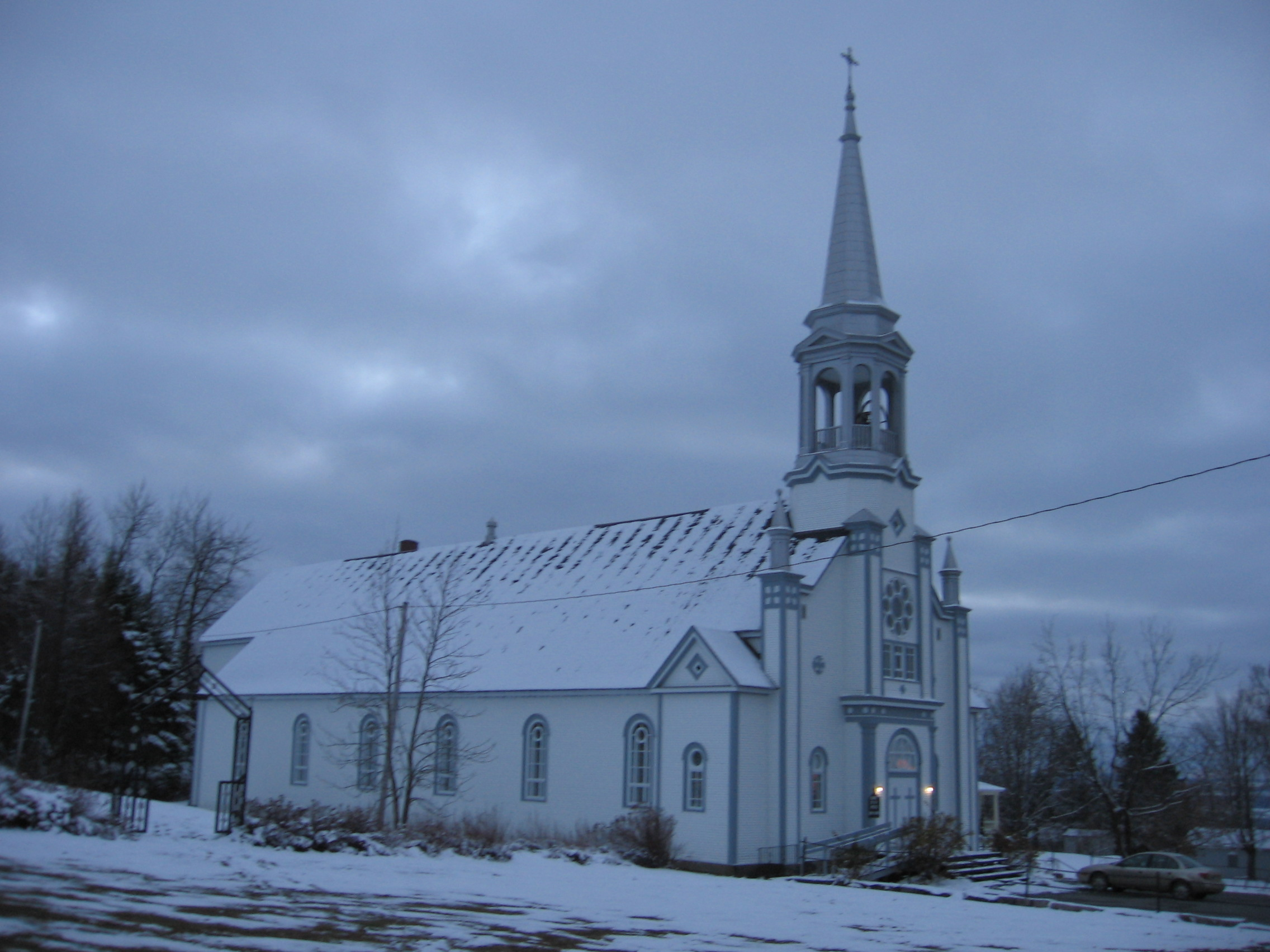

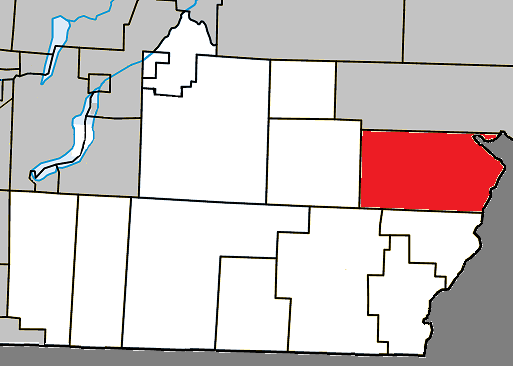
- Location within Coaticook RCM.

- Location in southern Quebec.
- Coordinates: 45°12′N 71°30′W
- Country: Canada
- Province: Quebec
- Region: Estrie
- RCM: Coaticook
- Constituted: January 1, 1870

Government
  - Mayor: Jacques Madore
  - Federal riding: Compton—Stanstead
  - Prov. riding: Saint-François

Area
  - Total: 133.10 km^{2} (51.39 sq mi)
  - Land: 131.83 km^{2} (50.90 sq mi)

Population (2021)
  - Total: 514
  - Density: 3.9/km^{2} (10/sq mi)
  - Pop 2016-2021: ▲8.2%
  - Dwellings: 265
- Time zone: UTC−5 (EST)
  - Summer (DST): UTC−4 (EDT)
- Postal code(s): J0B 2Y0
- Area code: 819
- Highways: R-206; R-253

Saint-Malo ((French pronunciation: [sɛ̃ malo])) is a municipality in Quebec, Canada, on the Canada–United States border. Saint-Malo has the highest elevation of any municipality in Quebec. At 640 metres (2,100 ft), local residents live in an environment of forests, farms, and waterways that supply their livelihood.

Every September, Saint-Malo holds a harvest festival that includes a harvest Mass. A popular point of interest is La Montagnaise, a 10 metres (33 ft)-tall observation tower built in 1995, that offers panoramic views of the countryside.

== History ==
The parish of Saint-Malo was established in 1863 by Canadiens and was incorporated as a municipality in 1910. The town's name evokes Saint-Malo, France— the hometown in Brittany of Jacques Cartier, the first European explorer to describe and map modern Quebec and to name his discoveries as "Canada".

== Demographics ==
=== Population ===
Population trend:

Census	Population	Change (%)
2021	514	▲8.2%
2016	475	▼1.7%
2011	483	▼10.2%
ADJ	538	▲4.3%
2006	516	▼0.4%
2001	518	▼5.1%
ADJ	546	▲4.3%
1996	375	▼6.5%
1991	401	N/A

ADJ = adjusted figures due to boundary changes between census years

== Geography and climate ==
Climate data for Saint-Malo, Quebec, 1981-2010 Normals (Extremes 1965-2001)
Month	Jan	Feb	Mar	Apr	May	Jun	Jul	Aug	Sep	Oct	Nov	Dec	Year
Record high °C (°F)	15.6 (60.1)	15.0 (59.0)	22.0 (71.6)	29.0 (84.2)	30.0 (86.0)	33.0 (91.4)	33.3 (91.9)	33.9 (93.0)	31.5 (88.7)	26.7 (80.1)	21.0 (69.8)	18.3 (64.9)	33.9 (93.0)
Mean daily maximum °C (°F)	−6.1 (21.0)	−4.2 (24.4)	1.0 (33.8)	8.7 (47.7)	16.0 (60.8)	21.0 (69.8)	23.1 (73.6)	22.2 (72.0)	17.6 (63.7)	10.3 (50.5)	3.8 (38.8)	−3.0 (26.6)	9.2 (48.6)
Daily mean °C (°F)	−10.9 (12.4)	−9.2 (15.4)	−3.8 (25.2)	3.7 (38.7)	10.5 (50.9)	15.6 (60.1)	17.9 (64.2)	17.1 (62.8)	12.7 (54.9)	6.0 (42.8)	−0.1 (31.8)	−7.2 (19.0)	4.4 (39.9)
Mean daily minimum °C (°F)	−15.7 (3.7)	−14.1 (6.6)	−8.7 (16.3)	−1.3 (29.7)	4.9 (40.8)	10.3 (50.5)	12.8 (55.0)	11.9 (53.4)	7.8 (46.0)	1.7 (35.1)	−4.0 (24.8)	−11.4 (11.5)	−0.5 (31.1)
Record low °C (°F)	−38.0 (−36.4)	−36.7 (−34.1)	−33.0 (−27.4)	−21.5 (−6.7)	−11.1 (12.0)	−3.5 (25.7)	1.7 (35.1)	0.0 (32.0)	−12.2 (10.0)	−10.5 (13.1)	−24.0 (−11.2)	−35.0 (−31.0)	−38.0 (−36.4)
Average precipitation mm (inches)	101.2 (3.98)	86.4 (3.40)	96.6 (3.80)	79.9 (3.15)	111.9 (4.41)	128.9 (5.07)	130.5 (5.14)	150.3 (5.92)	106.0 (4.17)	101.4 (3.99)	107.2 (4.22)	118.0 (4.65)	1,318.3 (51.90)
Average snowfall cm (inches)	82.4 (32.4)	68.3 (26.9)	66.0 (26.0)	23.8 (9.4)	1.5 (0.6)	0.0 (0.0)	0.0 (0.0)	0.0 (0.0)	0.0 (0.0)	5.8 (2.3)	38.7 (15.2)	82.3 (32.4)	368.7 (145.2)
Source: Environment Canada

== Notable people ==
- Michel Petit, NHL ice hockey player.

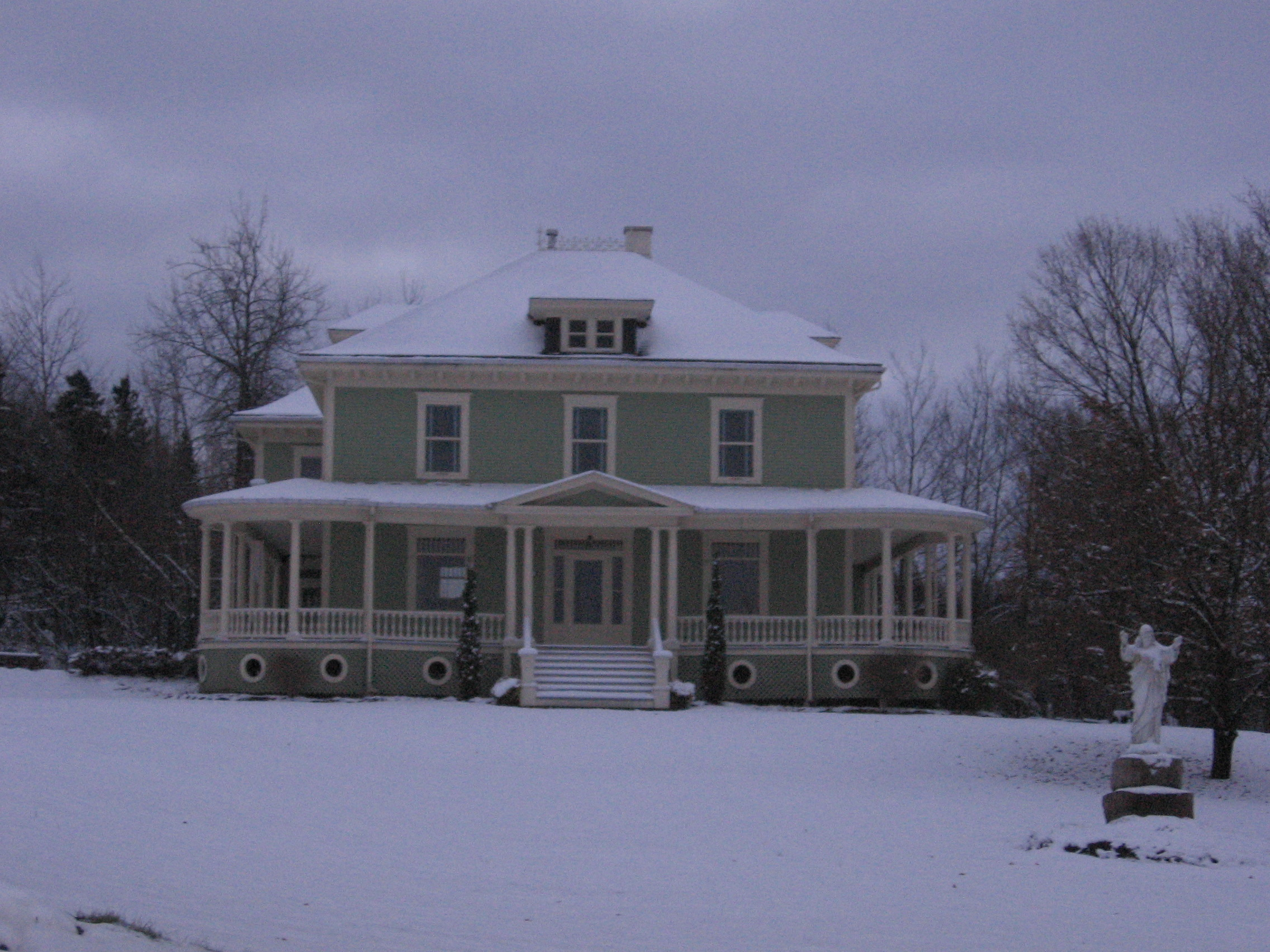
Saint-Malo rectory
