= Coaticook River =

River in the United States and Canada

Coordinates: 45°05′24″N 74°11′07″W

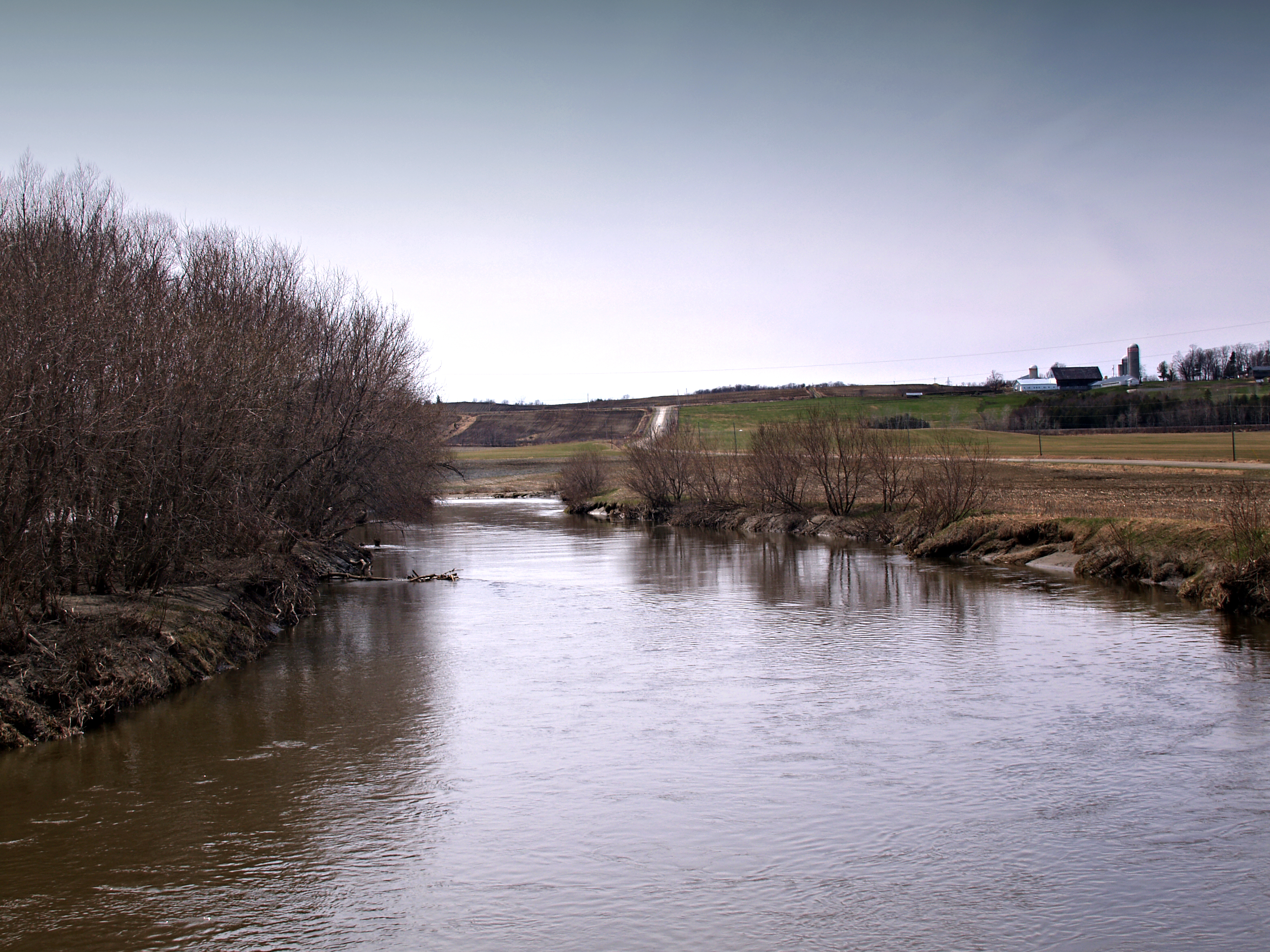

Location
- Country: United States, Canada

Physical characteristics
- Source
  - location: Norton Pond, Essex County, Vermont
- Mouth
  - location: Massawippi River, Waterville, Quebec
  - elevation: 149 m (489 ft)
- Length: 56 km (35 mi)
- Basin size: 364 km^{2} (141 sq mi)

Basin features
- Tributaries
  - left: (from mouth) creeks: Bradley, Drouin-Prémont, Sévigny, Ferland, Rodrigue, Giroux, Bissonnette, Lafond, Sylvestre (crossing the border), Mesker Meadow creek (Meadow Brook in USA); United States: Gaudette Brook, Sutton Brook
  - right: (from mouth) creeks: Saint-Michel, Bourdon-Drouin, branch Lachance, creek Cornoir, du Pont-Rouge, Grenier, Tremblay, Cushing, Verill; United States: Number Six, Number Five, Davis Brook, Station Brook

The Coaticook River is a north-flowing river rising in Vermont, United States, and located primarily in the Estrie region of Quebec, Canada. The mouth of the river is located north of Waterville and south of Lennoxville, near the southern border of the city of Sherbrooke, at the Massawippi River. Via the Massawippi and the Saint-François River, it is part of the St. Lawrence River watershed.

== Name ==
The name for the Coaticook River comes from the Abenaki name koatikeku which means "River of the land of the white pine". White pines were common in the surrounding region and the nearby upper Connecticut River valley. Names such as Coös, as in Coös County, New Hampshire, are derivative from this type of tree.

The toponym "Coaticook River" was officialized on December 5, 1968, at the Commission de toponymie du Québec.

== Geography ==
The source of the Coaticook River is Norton Pond (length 4.1 kilometers (2.5 mi), altitude 407 meters (1,335 ft)), in Essex County, Vermont, south of the Canada–US border. The valley holding this lake continues south across a low height of land, draining via the Pherrins River into the Clyde River at Island Pond, Vermont.

The Coaticook River flows northward 6.8 kilometers (4.2 mi) on American territory, crossing a forested and agricultural valley. A railway and Vermont Route 114 follow the river on the east side.

After crossing the international border, the river enters the municipality of Coaticook and flows generally north through:

- the hamlet of Stanhope (part of Coaticook);
- the village of Dixville;
- the city of Coaticook, where the river has dug a 50-metre-deep (160 ft) passage through rock formed thousands of years ago;
- the west side of the village of Compton;
- the village of Waterville.

North of Waterville the Coaticook joins the Massawippi River from the south, 5.9 kilometres (3.7 mi) upstream from the confluence of the Rivière aux Saumons and 8.8 kilometres (5.5 mi) upstream from the mouth of the Massawippi at the Saint-François River at Lennoxville, southeast of the center of Sherbrooke.

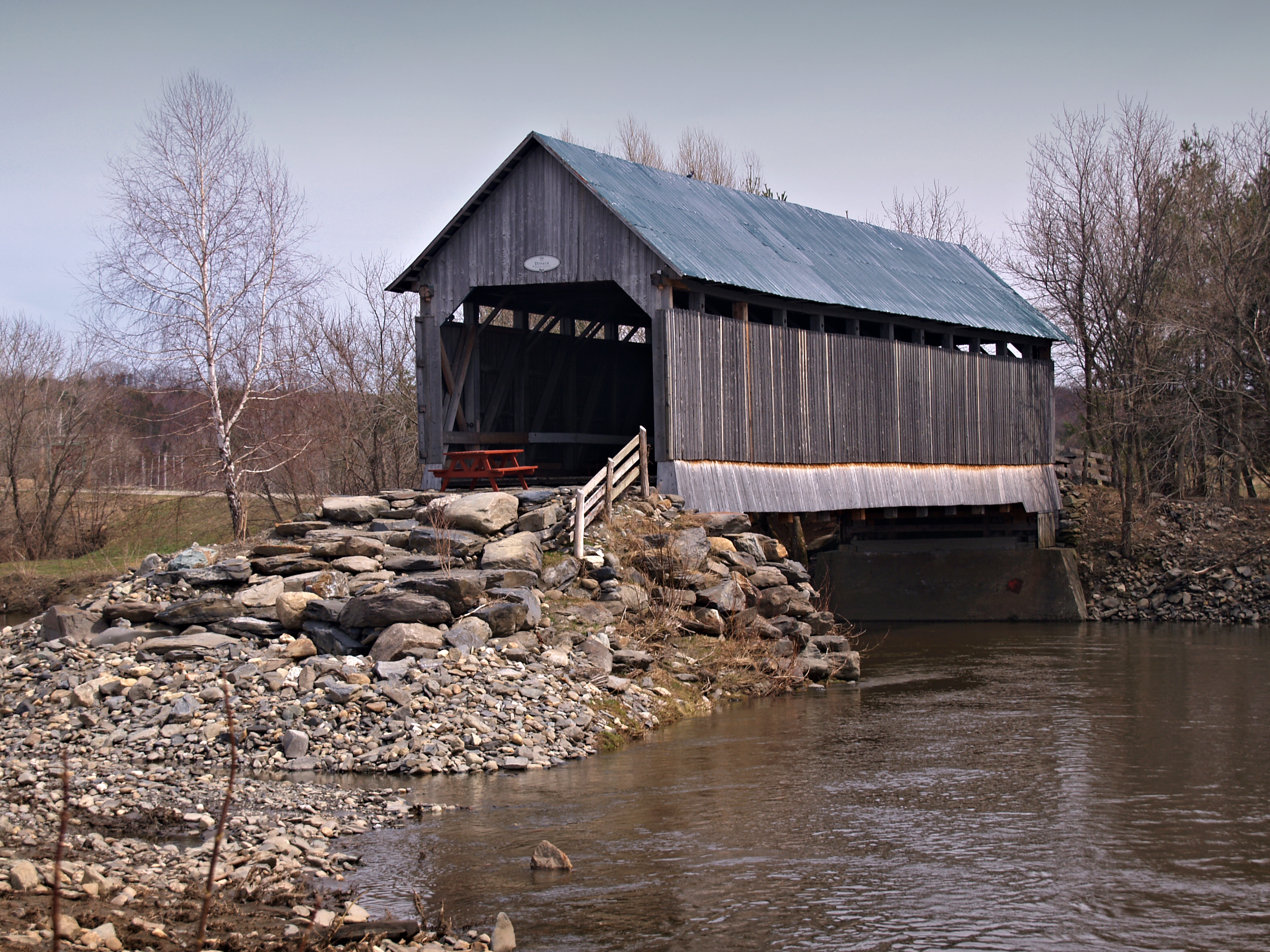
Pont Drouin

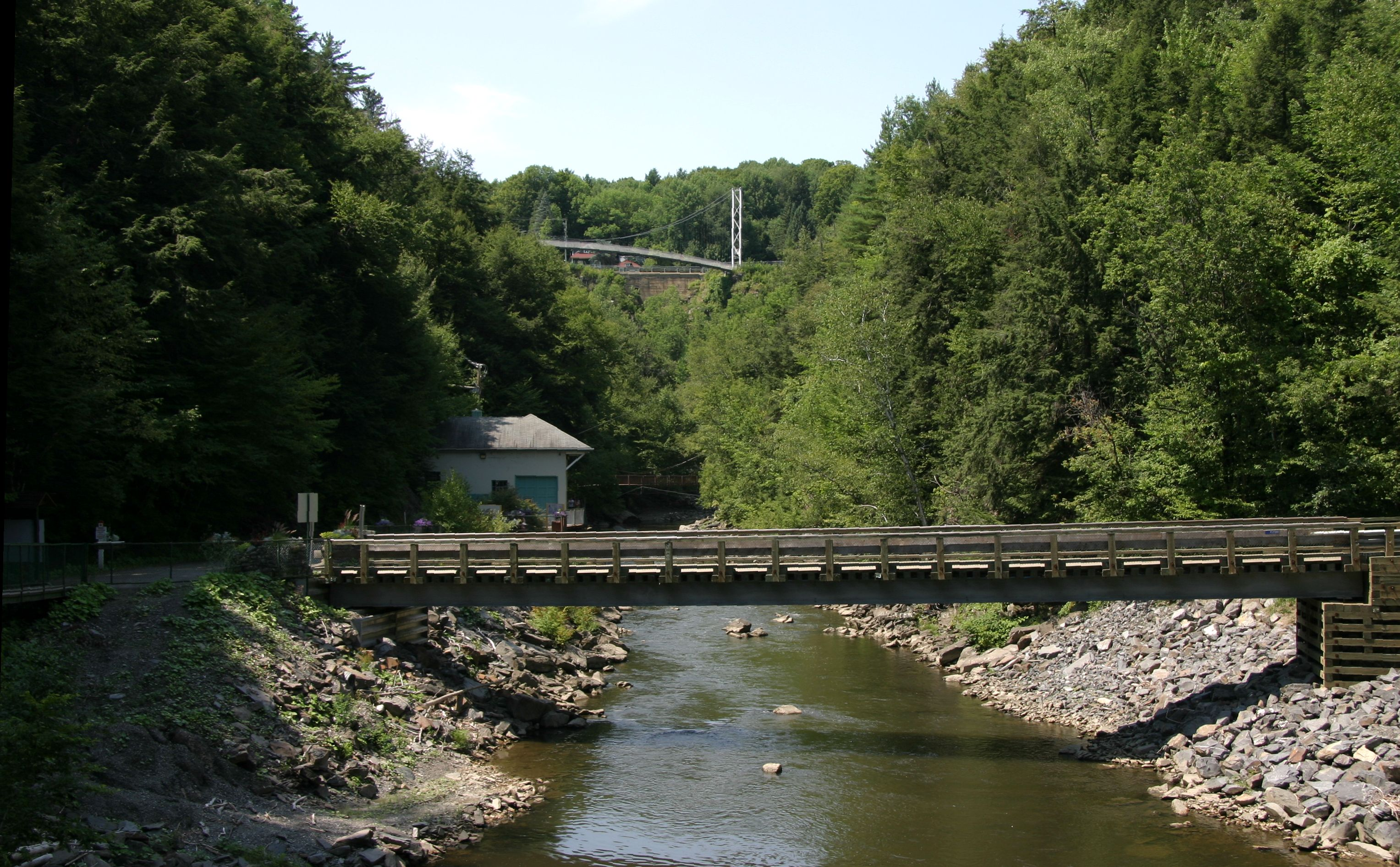
Bridges on Coaticook River

== See also ==
Media related to Rivière Coaticook at Wikimedia Commons

- Coaticook Regional County Municipality
- List of rivers of Quebec
- List of rivers of Vermont
