= Waterville, Quebec =

Waterville
- City
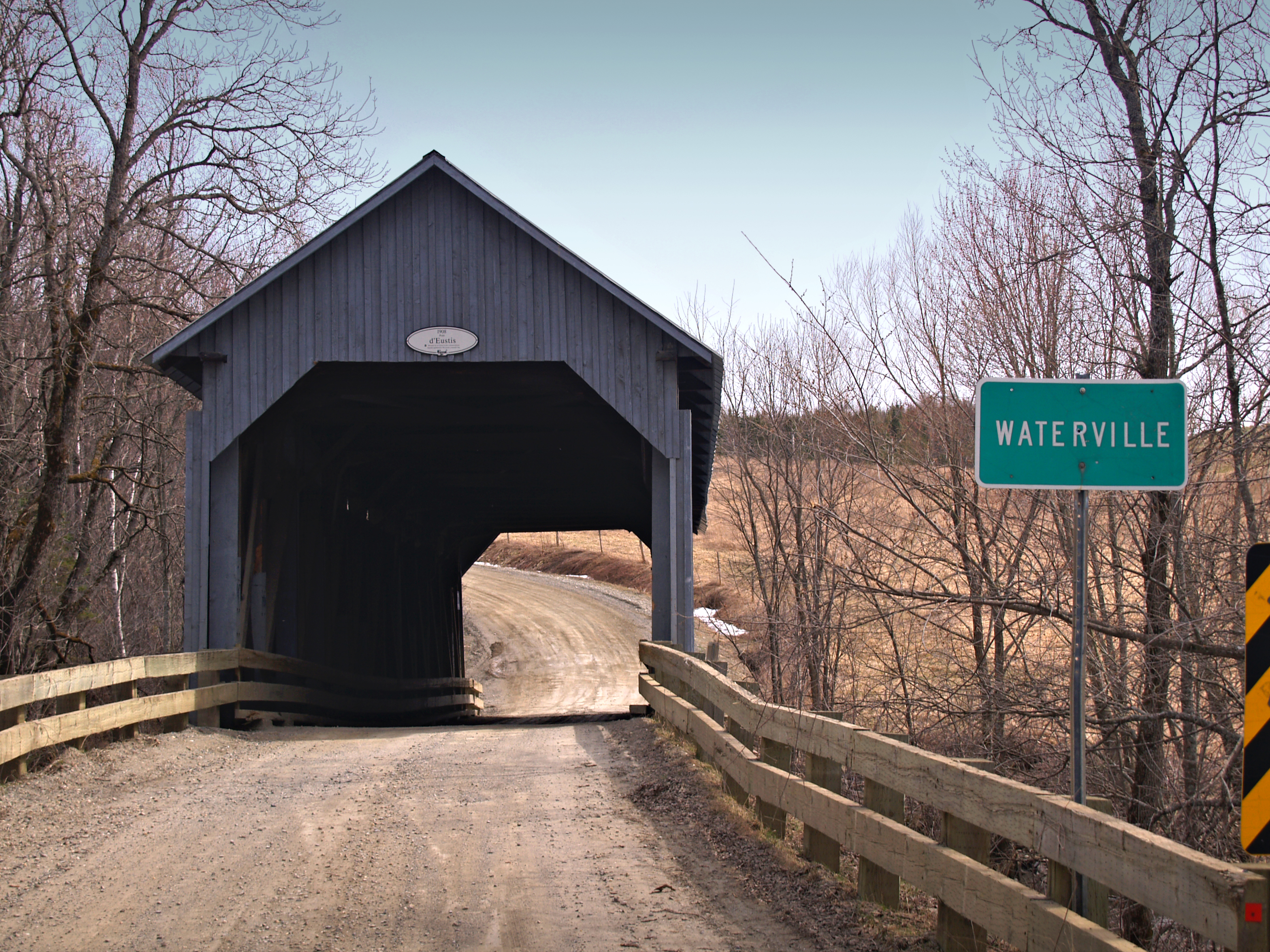

- Seal

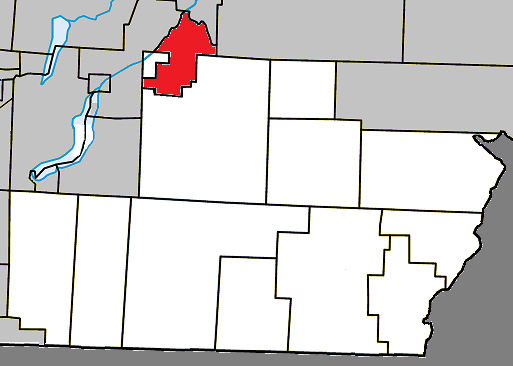
- Location within Coaticook RCM.

- Location in southern Quebec.
- Coordinates: 45°16′N 71°54′W
- Country: Canada
- Province: Quebec
- Region: Estrie
- RCM: Coaticook
- Constituted: January 1, 1876

Government
  - Mayor: Nathalie Dupuis
  - Federal riding: Compton—Stanstead
  - Prov. riding: Saint-François

Area
  - Total: 44.80 km^{2} (17.30 sq mi)
  - Land: 44.42 km^{2} (17.15 sq mi)

Population (2011)
  - Total: 2,028
  - Density: 45.7/km^{2} (118/sq mi)
  - Pop 2006-2011: ▲5.3%
  - Dwellings: 841
- Time zone: UTC−5 (EST)
  - Summer (DST): UTC−4 (EDT)
- Postal code(s): J0B 3H0
- Area code: 819
- Highways: R-108; R-143; R-147
- Website: www.waterville.ca

Waterville (Canadian French pronunciation: [wɑtɛʁvɪl]) is a city of 1,800 people in southeastern Quebec, Canada, in the Coaticook Regional County Municipality. Prior to January 1, 2002, it was in La Région-Sherbrookoise Regional County Municipality, and was the only member of that RCM that did not amalgamate into the expanded city of Sherbrooke on that date.

== History ==
Waterville owes its existence to water-power, harnessed first by a sawmill (1810) and subsequently by several other industries, which attracted its initial British, Loyalist and American population in 1870. Industrial development began in 1810 with the construction of a sawmill by a Compton Township businessman. Convinced by merchants in Quebec City, Joseph Pennoyer collected seven tons of hemp at his sawmill, intended for the manufacture of British ship cords. Inventor George Gale succeeded him in 1879, patenting his own mattress designs, which eventually made him one of the world's great inventors of box-springs and spring mattresses.

== Economy ==
Waterville remains an industrial centre, with three internationally recognized companies, one of which is Waterville TG, acquired by the Japanese giant Gosei in 1988 and specializing in auto-part manufacturing. Aside from the rubber, plastic moulding and woodworking factories, Waterville is also host to a number of interesting buildings: the mansard-style Gale family residence, now the Foyer Waterville; the Anglican church on the corner of Principale and Compton Ouest; a covered bridge dating from the second half of the 19th century; and the Ball residence, a Queen-Anne style house which belonged to the founders of the Dominion Snath company, once a North American leader in scythe handle production. The former Ball residence now houses a bed and breakfast. The nine-hole Bonnie View Golf Club, now known as the Waterville Golf Club, is among Quebec's oldest links.

== Demographics ==
In the 2021 Census of Population conducted by Statistics Canada, Waterville had a population of 2,307 living in 909 of its 950 total private dwellings, a change of 8.8% from its 2016 population of 2,121. With a land area of 44.03 km^{2} (17.00 sq mi), it had a population density of 52.4/km^{2} (135.7/sq mi) in 2021.

Population trend

| Census | Population | Change (%) |
|---|---|---|
| 2011 | 2,028 | ▲5.3% |
| 2006 | 1,926 | ▼0.9% |
| ADJ | 1,944 + | ▲6.6% |
| 2001 | 1,824 | ▼1.2% |
| ADJ | 1,846 + | ▲38.6% |
| 1996 | 1,332 | ▼0.4% |
| 1991 | 1,337 | N/A |

(+) adjusted figures due to boundary changes

== See also ==
- List of anglophone communities in Quebec
