= Dixville, Quebec =

Dixville
- Municipality
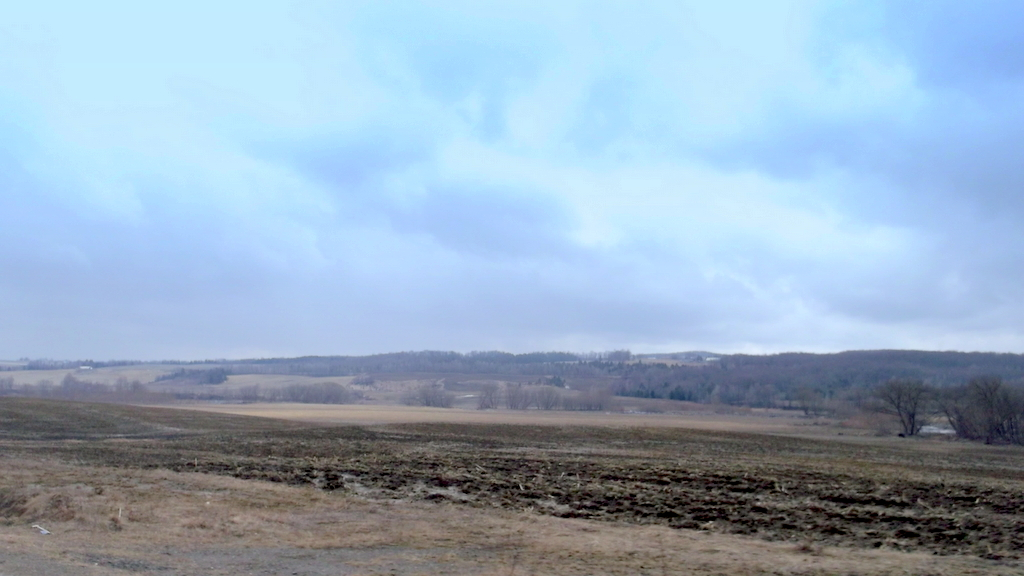

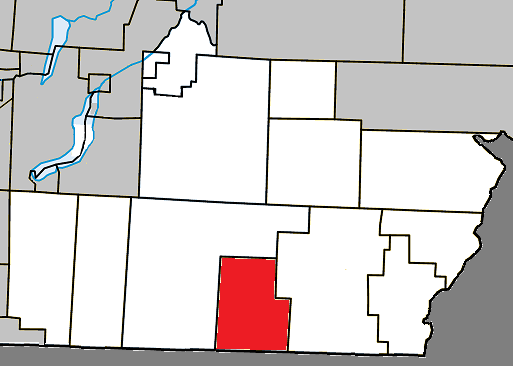
- Location within Coaticook RCM

- Location in southern Quebec
- Coordinates: 45.07°N 71.77°W
- Country: Canada
- Province: Quebec
- Region: Estrie
- RCM: Coaticook
- Constituted: September 27, 1995

Government
  - Mayor: Réal Ouimette
  - Federal riding: Compton—Stanstead
  - Prov. riding: Saint-François

Area
  - Total: 77.40 km^{2} (29.88 sq mi)
  - Land: 76.56 km^{2} (29.56 sq mi)

Population (2021)
  - Total: 732
  - Density: 9.6/km^{2} (25/sq mi)
  - Pop 2016-2021: ▲5.2%
  - Dwellings: 303
- Time zone: UTC−5 (EST)
  - Summer (DST): UTC−4 (EDT)
- Postal code(s): J0B 1P0
- Area code: 819
- Highways: R-141; R-147
- Website: www.dixville.ca

Dixville is a municipality in Quebec, Canada, situated east of Stanstead, in the regional county municipality of Coaticook within the region of the Estrie.

== History ==
Dixville was originally known as "Drew's Mills", named after a settler, who the early 1800s, had built a saw mill at this location on the Coaticook River. The settlement began around the year 1830; the site was back then part of the Township of Barford. A Mr. Drew set up a dwelling on the banks of the Coaticook River, cleared land to build a sawmill beside a dam which he had built. In 1836, John Wright came to join up with Drew. Soon after, others came to this place and the village became known as Drew's Mills.

Shortly before the turn of the century, it was renamed Dixville, after Richard Dick Baldwin, who was known as "Uncle Dick" by the majority of the town's residents.

The name Saint-Mathieu-de-Dixville was used in the past. It may be the name of the local Roman Catholic church.

== Demographics ==
=== Population ===
Population trend:

Census	Population	Change (%)
2021	732	▲3.6%
2016	696	▼2.0%
2011	710	▲3.6%
2006	685	▼8.2%
2001	746	▼0.7%
1996	751	▼5.7%
1991	796	N/A

== Dam ==
There is a dam in the municipality at 45° 04' 07" 71° 46' 15"

== See also ==
- List of anglophone communities in Quebec
