= Compton, Quebec =

Compton
- Municipality
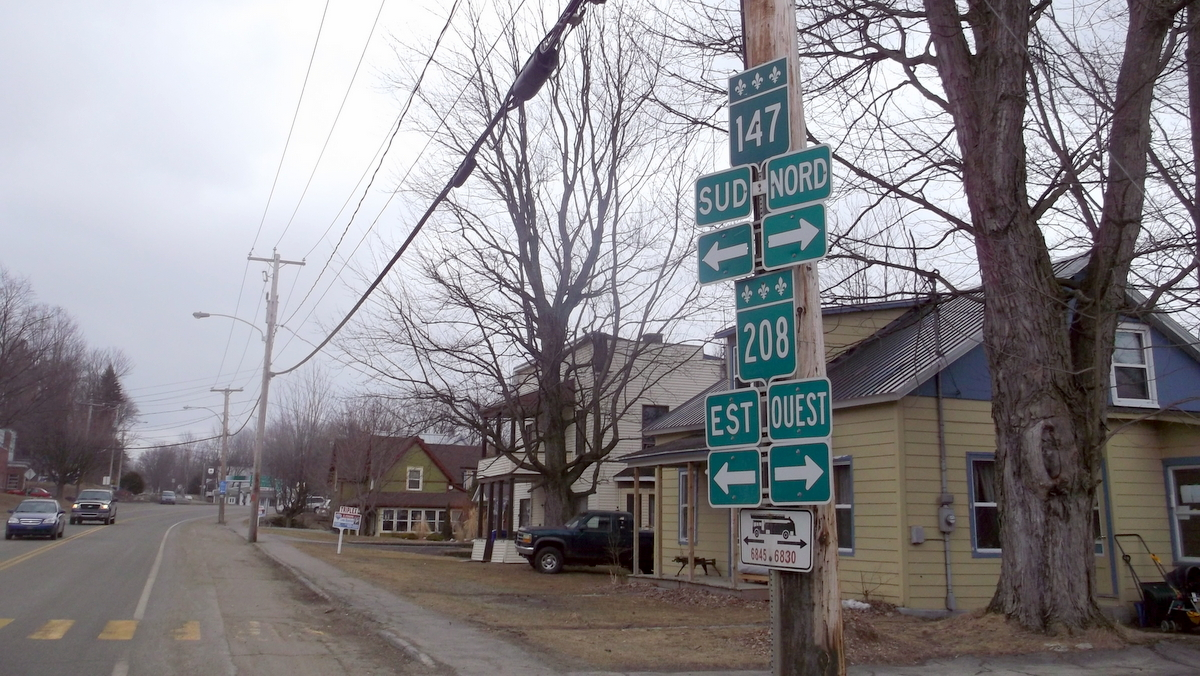

- Coat of arms

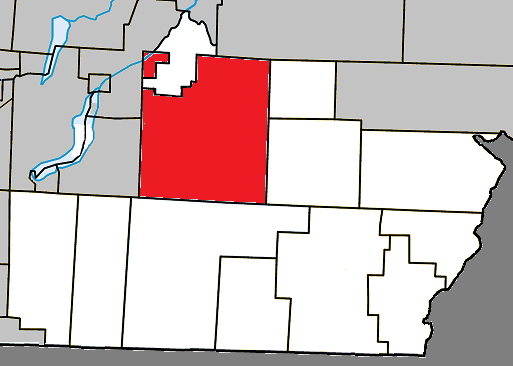
- Location within Coaticook RCM

- Location in southern Quebec
- Coordinates: 45.2333°N 71.8167°W
- Country: Canada
- Province: Quebec
- Region: Estrie
- RCM: Coaticook
- Constituted: December 8, 1999

Government
  - Mayor: Fernand Veilleux
  - Federal riding: Compton—Stanstead
  - Prov. riding: Saint-François

Area
  - Total: 208.30 km^{2} (80.43 sq mi)
  - Land: 205.47 km^{2} (79.33 sq mi)

Population (2011)
  - Total: 3,112
  - Density: 15.1/km^{2} (39/sq mi)
  - Pop 2006-2011: ▲10.4%
  - Dwellings: 1,272
- Time zone: UTC−5 (EST)
  - Summer (DST): UTC−4 (EDT)
- Postal code(s): J0B 1L0
- Area code: 819
- Highways: R-143; R-147; R-208
- Website: www.compton.ca

Compton is a municipality in Coaticook Regional County Municipality in the Estrie region of Quebec, Canada.

== Demographics ==
=== Population ===
Population trend:

Census	Population	Change (%)
2011	3,112	▲10.4%
2006	2,818	▼8.9%
ADJ	2,927 (+)	▼3.9%
2001	3,047	▲0.1%
ADJ	3,043 (+)	▲39.3%
1996	2,185	▲5.7%
1991	2,067	N/A

(+) adjusted figures due to boundary changes

== Notable people ==
- Louis Saint-Laurent (1882–1973), Prime Minister of Canada (he was born in Compton, and his birthplace, a museum, is now a National Historic Site of Canada. He is buried nearby).
- Bernard St-Laurent, CBC Radio personality
- Maryse Dubuc, creator of The Bellybuttons
- William H. Bringloe, Canadian Hall of Fame and North American Champion racehorse trainer
- Lucius Seth Huntington (1827–1886) Canadian lawyer, journalist and political figure

== See also ==
- List of anglophone communities in Quebec
