= Sainte-Edwidge-de-Clifton =

- Township municipality
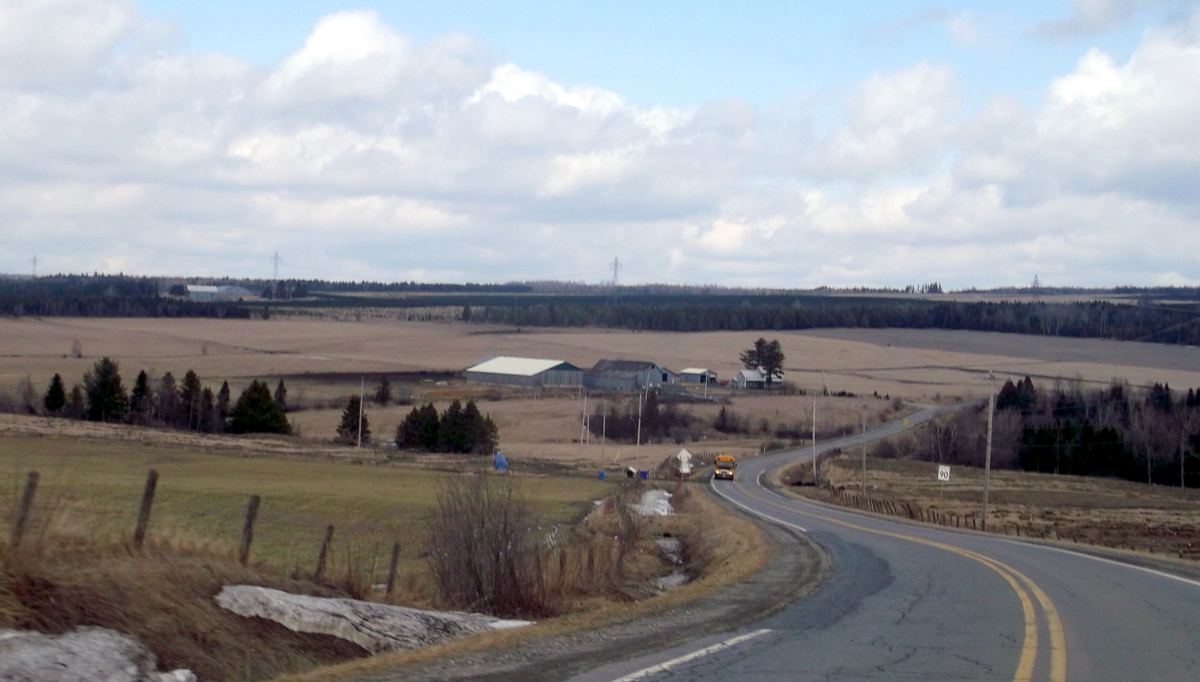

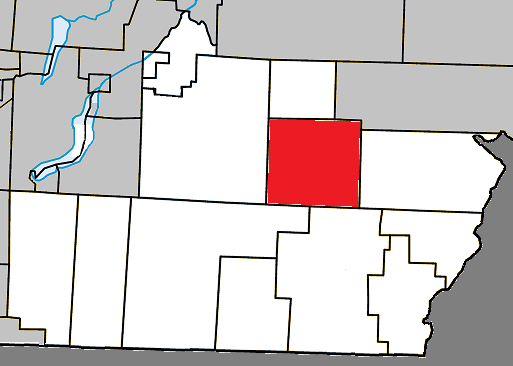
- Location within Coaticook RCM

- Location in southern Quebec
- Coordinates: 45.2°N 71.68°W
- Country: Canada
- Province: Quebec
- Region: Estrie
- RCM: Coaticook
- Constituted: December 21, 1895
- Named for: Hedwig of Silesia

Government
  - Mayor: Bernard Marion
  - Federal riding: Compton—Stanstead
  - Prov. riding: Saint-François

Area
  - Total: 102.20 km^{2} (39.46 sq mi)
  - Land: 101.80 km^{2} (39.31 sq mi)

Population (2016)
  - Total: 504
  - Density: 5/km^{2} (13/sq mi)
  - Pop 2011-2016: ▲4.1%
  - Dwellings: 190
- Time zone: UTC−5 (EST)
  - Summer (DST): UTC−4 (EDT)
- Postal code(s): J0B 2R0
- Area code: 819
- Highways: R-206; R-251
- Website: www.ste-edwidge.ca

Sainte-Edwidge-de-Clifton (French pronunciation: [sɛ̃t ɛdwidʒ də kliftən]) is a township municipality in the Canadian province of Quebec, located within the Coaticook Regional County Municipality. The township had a population of 504 in the Canada 2016 Census.

== Demographics ==
In the 2021 Census of Population conducted by Statistics Canada, Sainte-Edwidge-de-Clifton had a population of 546 living in 200 of its 208 total private dwellings, a change of 8.3% from its 2016 population of 504. With a land area of 101.84 km^{2} (39.32 sq mi), it had a population density of 5.4/km^{2} (13.9/sq mi) in 2021.

Population trend:

Census	Population	Change (%)
2016	504	▲4.1%
2011	484	▲10.0%
2006	440	▼0.2%
2001	533	▲0.6%
1996	530	▼6.0%
1991	564	N/A
