= Niger River (Tomifobia River tributary) =

River in Estrie, Quebec (Canada)

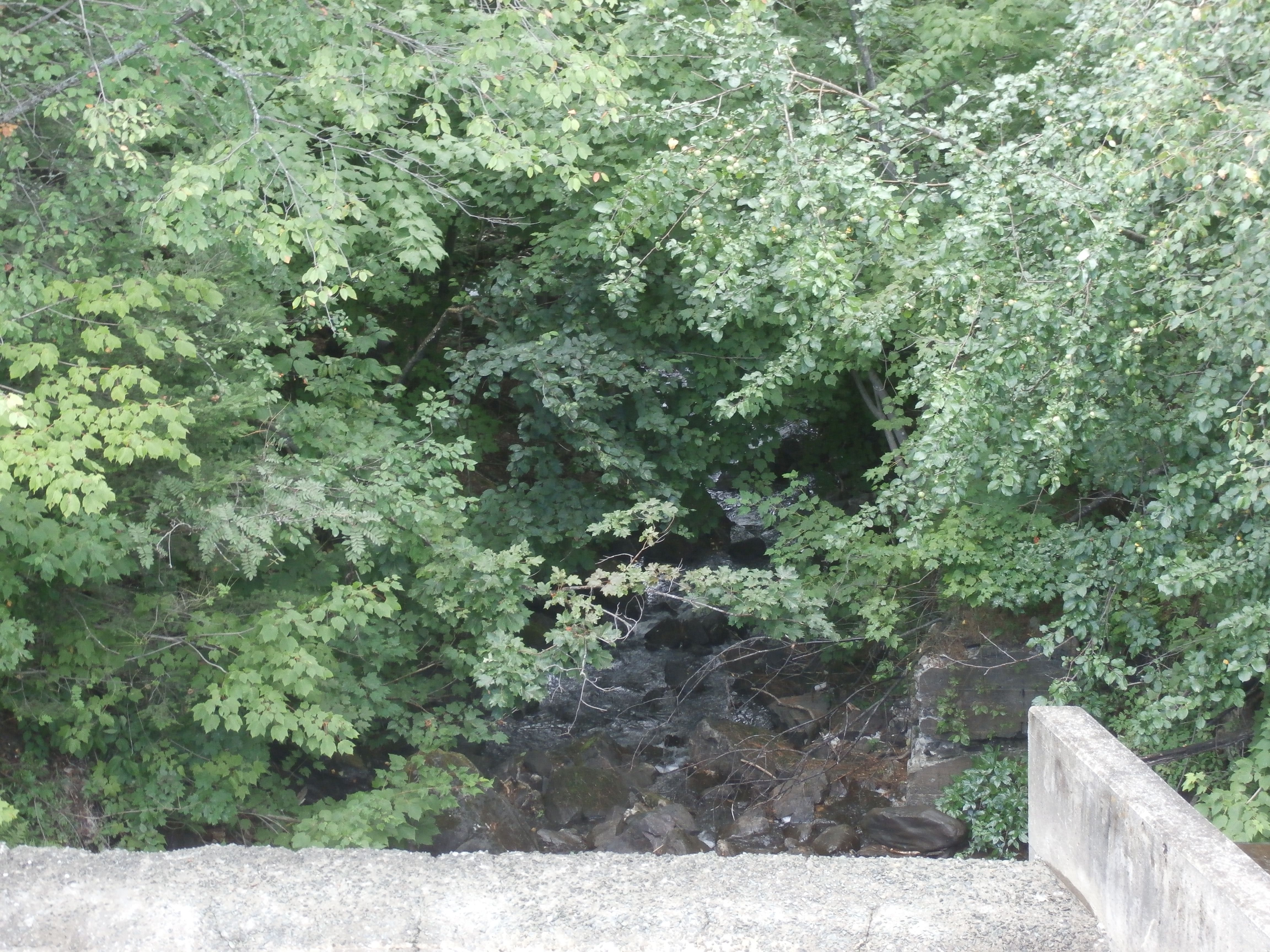
- Source of the Niger River at the Lyster Lake Dam.

- Location within Quebec
- Native name: Rivière Niger (French)

Location
- Country: Canada
- Province: Quebec
- Region: Estrie
- RCM: Memphrémagog Regional County Municipality
- Ville: North Hatley

Physical characteristics
- Source: Lyster lake
  - location: Coaticook
  - coordinates: 45.028421°N 71.921454°W
  - elevation: 359 m (1,178 ft)
- Mouth: Tomifobia River
  - location: Hatley
  - coordinates: 45.16528°N 72.03194°W
  - elevation: 161 m (528 ft)
- Length: 13.0 km (8.1 mi)

Basin features
- Progression: Tomifobia River, Lake Massawippi, Massawippi River, Saint-François River, Saint Lawrence River
- Tributaries
  - left: (upstream) ruisseau Bull, cours d'eau Champagne, décharge du lac Lyster
  - right: (upstream) cours d'eau Ménard, cours d'eau Chabert, ruisseau de la Meder

The Niger River is a tributary of the Tomifobia River. The Niger River flows successively in the municipalities of Coaticook, Barnston-Ouest, Stanstead-Est and Hatley, in the Memphrémagog Regional County Municipality (MRC), in the administrative region of Estrie, in Quebec, in Canada.

== Geography ==
The neighboring hydrographic slopes of the Niger River are:

- north side: Lake Massawippi, Tomifobia River;
- east side: discharge from Luster lake, Meder stream, Coaticook River;
- south side: Tomifobia River, Johns River (Vermont), Clyde River (Vermont);
- west side: Tomifobia River.

The Lyster Lake (length: 2.4 kilometres (1.5 mi); altitude: 461 metres (1,512 ft)) constitutes the main source of the Niger river. This lake is located in the territory of the municipality of Coaticook, less than one km from the American border. Mount Barnston is located on the southwest side of the lake, Mont Séguin to the west and Mount Pinacle to the east. Lyster Lake is fed by "Little Baldwin Lake" (elevation: 468 metres (1,535 ft)) (coming from the east), Brandy Creek (coming from the south) and Fontaine Creek (coming from the East).

From Lyster Lake, the Niger River flows over 13 kilometres (8.1 mi):

- 1.3 kilometres (0.81 mi) north, in the municipality of Coaticook, to the Mede stream. Note: Formerly, this first segment was referred to as the "Lyster Lake Outlet";
- 2.6 kilometres (1.6 mi) northwesterly, to the limit of the municipality of Barnston-Ouest;
- 1.2 kilometres (0.75 mi) north-west, to the Ménard stream;
- 1.5 kilometres (0.93 mi) north-west, to the bridge over the hamlet of Ways Mills;
- 2.0 kilometres (1.2 mi) northwesterly to William Creek;
- 1.0 kilometre (0.62 mi) northwesterly, up to the limit of the municipality of Stanstead-Est;
- 2.3 kilometres (1.4 mi) north-westerly, crossing the reservoir of the Chute-Burroughs dam, to the limit of the municipality of Hatley;
- 1.1 kilometres (0.68 mi) towards the north-west, in the municipality of Hatley.

In sum, the Niger River crosses the municipality of Barnston-Ouest, intersects the northeast corner of the municipality of Standstead and empties into the Tomifobia River at Hatley, three km upstream from the confluence with lake Massawippi. A few kilometers before its mouth, the Niger River includes a reservoir created by the Chute-Burroughs dam.

The Niger River empties on the east bank of the Tomifobia River.

== Toponymy ==
Formerly, the spelling of the toponym "Niger river" was written "Nigger river".

The toponym "Niger River" originates from the presence of African Americans around this watercourse from the beginning of the 19th century. It is not unreasonable to believe that slaves took the river route to flee north from the American states. At the end of the 19th century, workers of African-American origin were working in the sawmills in the area and in the resort homes in the region.

The work "Forests and Clearings: The History of Stanstead County […]", published in 1874, indicates that the toponym of the river comes from the establishment around 1804 of a black family named Tatton, on its banks. in the Barnston area. In this work, the river is referred to as "Negro River". Oral or popular tradition provides other interpretations as to the origin of the appellation, in particular that the name of the river comes from that of a part of the equipment of a sawmill called "nigger".

The first attestation of the current name "Niger River" is reported in 1863 on the Map of the "District of St Francis (Putnam and Gray)". The term "niger" comes from the Latin form of "black".

The toponym "rivière Niger" was made official on September 4, 2006, at the Commission de toponymie du Québec.

== See also ==
- St. Lawrence River
- List of rivers of Quebec
