= Tomifobia River =

River in Quebec, Canada

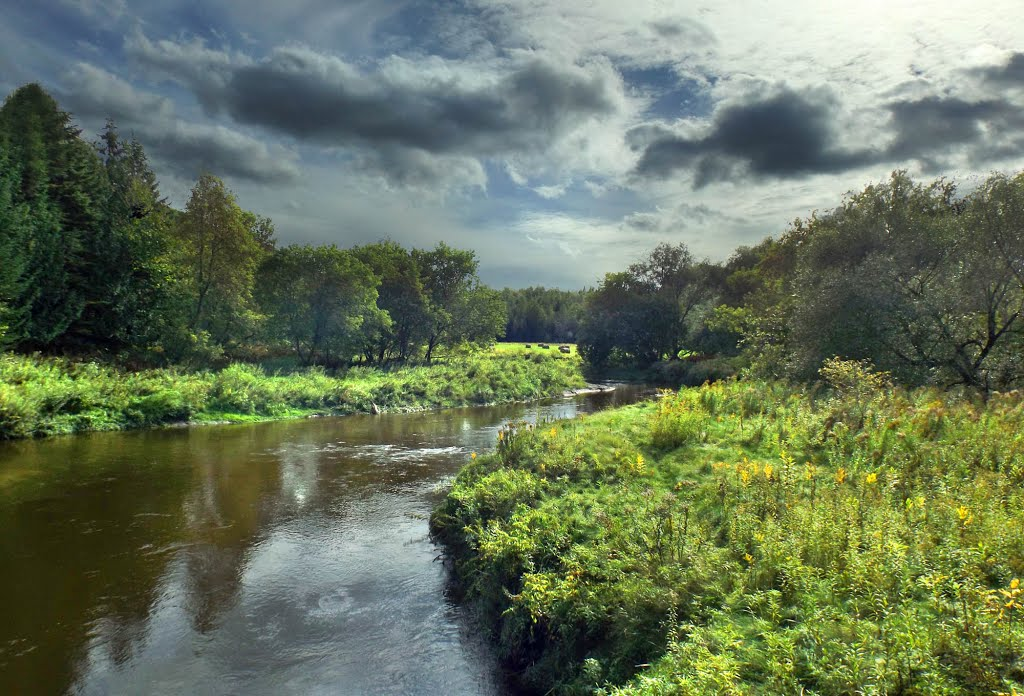
- Meandering between the hamlets of Tomifobia and Boynton

- Location within Quebec
- Native name: Rivière Tomifobia (French)

Location
- Country: Canada
- Province: Quebec
- Region: Estrie
- MRC: Memphrémagog Regional County Municipality
- Municipality: Barnston-Ouest, Hatley

Physical characteristics
- Source
  - location: Barnston-Ouest
  - coordinates: 45°02′43″N 71°56′27″W
  - elevation: 489 m (1,604 ft)
- Mouth: Saint-François River
  - location: Hatley
  - coordinates: 45°11′15″N 72°01′33″W
  - elevation: 160 m (520 ft)
- Length: 10.8 km (6.7 mi)

Basin features
- Progression: Saint-François River, Saint Lawrence River
- Tributaries
  - left: (upstream) ruisseau Ticehurst, ruisseau Dustin, ruisseau Day, ruisseau Côté, ruisseau Hatch, ruisseau Lefebvre, ruisseau Bachetor, ruisseau Holland (Holland Brook) in Vermont
  - right: (upstream) Niger River (Tomifobia River tributary), ruisseau Pinkham, ruisseau Embury, ruisseau Benson, ruisseau Pomery, ruisseau Major

The Tomifobia River is a flowing body of fresh water in Memphremagog Regional County Municipality, in the Eastern Townships, in the province of Quebec, in Canada. The river forms a part of an international border between Canada and the United States near the village of Beebe Plain, Vermont.

== Tomifobia Nature Trail ==
Located at fifteen minutes by car from Magog, Quebec, the "Tomifobia Nature Trail" with a length of 19 kilometres (12 mi) links the Lake Massawippi (either Ayer's Cliff, Quebec) to Beebe Plain, Vermont along the west bank of the Tomifobia river, through Stanstead, Quebec which is located before the border Quebec-Vermont. This trail in the heart of a linear park of 140 acres, also interconnects to other paths in Vermont. This trail is mostly used in three seasons by cyclists, hikers, runners feet; and in winter by cross-country ski enthusiasts. This trail is a preferred corridor for wildlife observation of animal and flora in a wild nature and the flowing Tomifobia river at the center of this little valley. This linear park attracts thousands of visitors who enjoy including three car parking lots Ayer's Cliff allowing them to take the path.

== Course ==
River catchment neighbours of the Tomifobia are:

- North side: Lake Massawippi;
- East Side: Niger River, discharge of Lyster Lake;
- South side: Johns River (Vermont), Clyde River (Vermont);
- West side: Lake Memphremagog.

The Tomifobia River is the primary source of Lake Massawippi. This lake was originally called Lake Tomifobi, and at the lake's exit, the river is renamed the Massawippi River. The Massawippi River is the emissary of Lake Massawippi; she will join the St. Francis River. The Tomifobia River runs through an area that is mostly provincially protected Green Zone within the counties of Stanstead township, Stanstead East, and Ogden. This has helped protect the river from heavy waterfront housing growth (except near Lake Massawippi in Ayer's Cliff), characteristic of a number of other bodies of water in the area.

== Watershed ==
Part of the river's watershed extends into Vermont. US lands draining into the river directly or indirectly include: Derby, Holland, and a small portion of Norton, Holland and Beaver Ponds.

While a study by Roberge & Roy (2004) suggests there is little continuously suspended sediment in the river, there are some concerns about the expansion of the Tomifobia delta at the mouth of Lake Massawippi. Research indicates that this delta has been built through sporadic hydrological events rather than through agricultural catchment. Nevertheless, agricultural practices have undoubtedly contributed to the high levels of phosphates detected in lower portions of the river following periods of heavy rainfall.

== Natural history ==
Fish include brook, grey, brown, and rainbow trout, landlocked atlantic salmon, walleye, small-mouth bass, and mullet. A number of rare animal species, including the endangered wood turtle (Clemmys insculpta), have been documented within the wetlands of the Tomifobia valley, the Appalachian Corridor Appalachien (ACA). Avians in the area include bald eagles. Aquatic mammals include North American river otter and North American beaver.

== Etymology ==
Although its meaning is unknown, the origin of the name "Tomifobia" is likely Algonquian, the language spoken by the Abenaki tribes that seasonally travelled on the lake and river systems of the Eastern Townships prior to European settlement.

== History ==
Kilborn's Mills on the Tomifobia, Stanstead County (c. 1830), built in 1803 by Colonel Charles Kilborn

An important link between the Connecticut and Saint Lawrence basins, the Tomifobia River is one of the most southern rivers to flow northward and eventually drain into the Saint Lawrence (via the Saint Francis). The Abenaki allied themselves with France during the French and Indian Wars and the Tomifobia valley remained part of New France until the 1763 Treaty of Paris, which granted the region to the English. Cited on maps as the "Barlow River" prior to 1900, the Tomifobia River valley was settled by United Empire Loyalists in the late 18th-century soon after the Constitutional Act of 1791 opened the land of what was then Lower Canada. Significant communities developed around a series of mills that were built on the river in the early part of the 19th-century , leading to the establishment of Boynton, Tomifobia [formerly Smith's Mills], and Stanstead Plain [Kilborn's Mills]. Each of these villages became stops along an important stagecoach and later railroad route between Boston and Montreal (the Massawippi Valley Railroad became part of the Boston and Maine Railroad network in 1867).

The 19-kilometre (12 mi) Tomifobia Nature Trail, formerly a CP Rail/Quebec Central Railway bed, borders much of the river between the villages of Ayer's Cliff, Quebec and Beebe Plain, passing through the hamlets of Tomifobia and Boynton.

== Economy ==
Historically, mills situated along the river would have dominated the economy of the region, along with agricultural activities in the surrounding countryside. Today the Tomifobia River is an important tourist attraction, offering recreational summer activities including canoeing/kayaking, cycling, hiking, bird watching, and sport fishing. Wintertime attractions include cross-country skiing and snow-shoeing.

== See also ==
- Stanstead, Quebec
- Lake Memphremagog
- Lake Massawippi
- Eastern Townships
- List of rivers of Quebec
