= Hatley, Quebec =

Hatley, Quebec may refer to:

- Hatley, Quebec (historic township), the historic township that led to the creation of :
  - Hatley, Quebec (municipality), an unqualified municipality
  - Hatley, Quebec (township), a nearby township municipality

== See also ==
- North Hatley, Quebec
