= Massawippi =

Hamlet in Quebec, Canada

- hamlet
- Interactive map of Massawippi
- Coordinates: 45.18139°N 71.99055°W
- Country: Canada
- Province: Quebec
- Region: Estrie
- RCM: Memphrémagog
- Municipality: Hatley

Massawippi is a hamlet and former railway station in the municipality of Hatley, Quebec.

== Transportation ==
Massawippi is served by two highways: Quebec Route 143 and Quebec Route 208. The Massawippi Valley Railway was abandoned in 1990 and the tracks were removed in 1992.
