= Lake Massawippi =

Lake in Quebec, Canada

- Lac Massawippi (French)
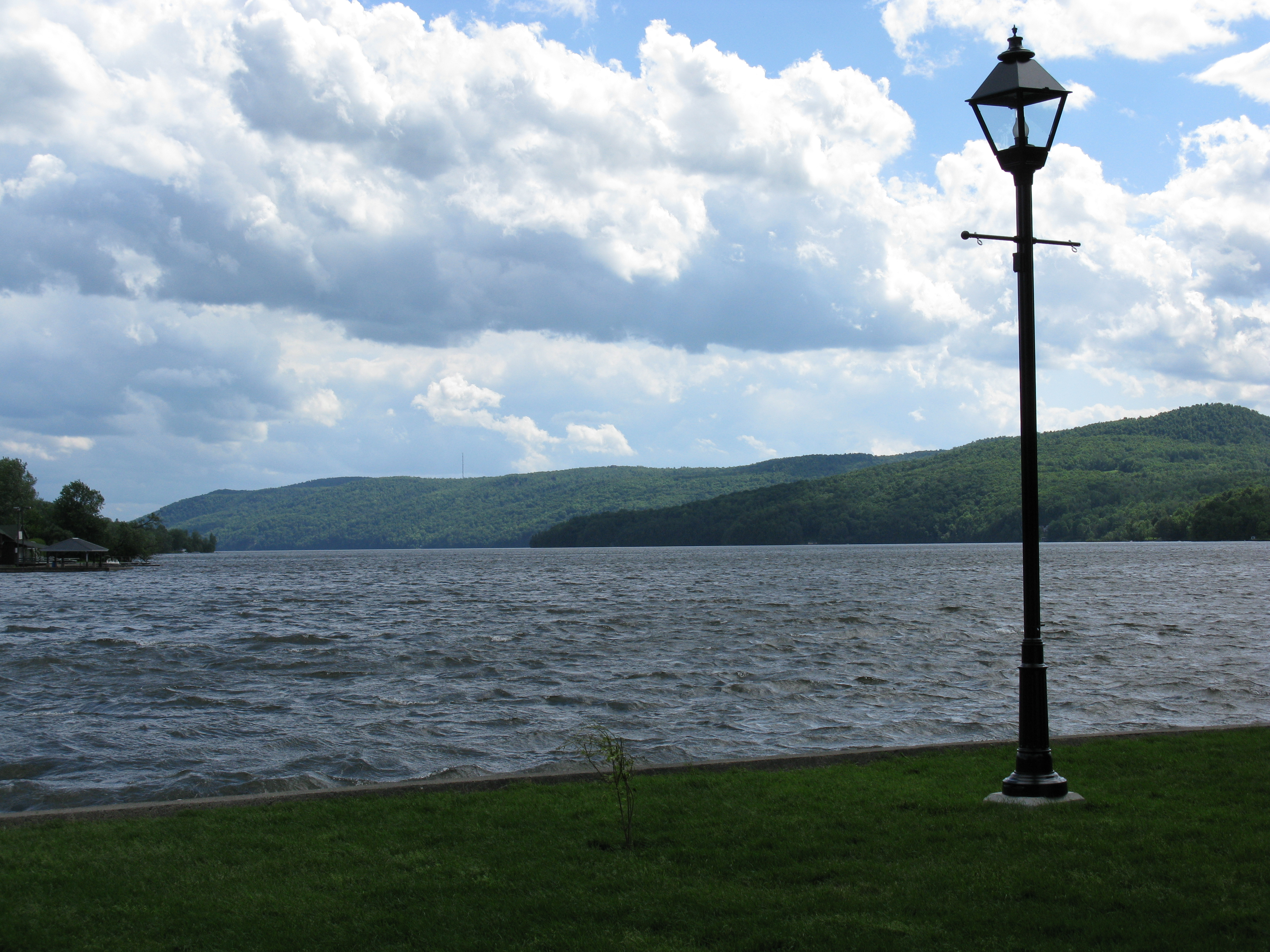
- Lake Massawippi, seen from North Hatley

- Location within Quebec

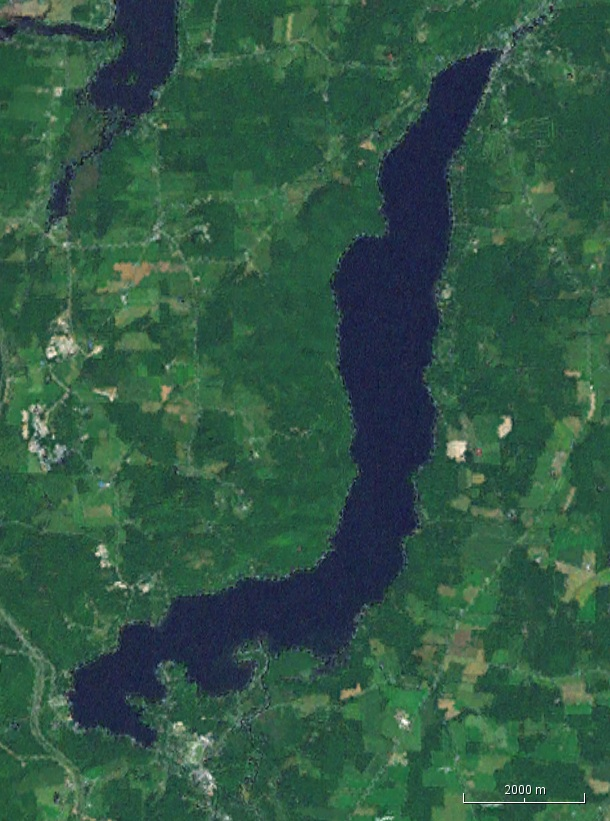
- Satellite view of Lake Massawippi
- Location: Memphrémagog Regional County Municipality, Estrie, Quebec
- Coordinates: 45°12′57″N 71°59′58″W
- Type: Natural
- Primary inflows: Tomifobia River
- Primary outflows: Massawippi River
- Catchment area: 586 square kilometres (226 sq mi)
- Basin countries: Canada
- Max. length: 14.2 kilometres (8.8 mi)
- Max. width: 1.9 kilometres (1.2 mi)
- Surface area: 18.7 square kilometres (7.2 sq mi)
- Average depth: 41.6 metres (136 ft)
- Max. depth: 85.7 metres (281 ft)
- Water volume: 0.745 cubic kilometres (0.179 cu mi)
- Shore length^{1}: 38.3 kilometres (23.8 mi)
- Surface elevation: 161 metres (528 ft)
- Settlements: North Hatley
- ^{1} Shore length is not a well-defined measure.

Lake Massawippi is a freshwater lake in Memphrémagog Regional County Municipality in the Estrie region of Quebec, Canada. The Tomifobia River is the source of the lake at its southern tip, near the village of Ayer's Cliff, Quebec. In early records, the lake was also called "Lake Tomifobi". The current of the lake flows north, funneling into the Massawippi River at the village of North Hatley, Quebec on Massawippi's northern shore.

It is bordered by five municipalities: North Hatley, Hatley Township, the municipality of Hatley, Ayer's Cliff and Sainte-Catherine-de-Hatley.

Massawippi is an Abenaki word that translates to "the big deep lake" in English.

== Leisure ==
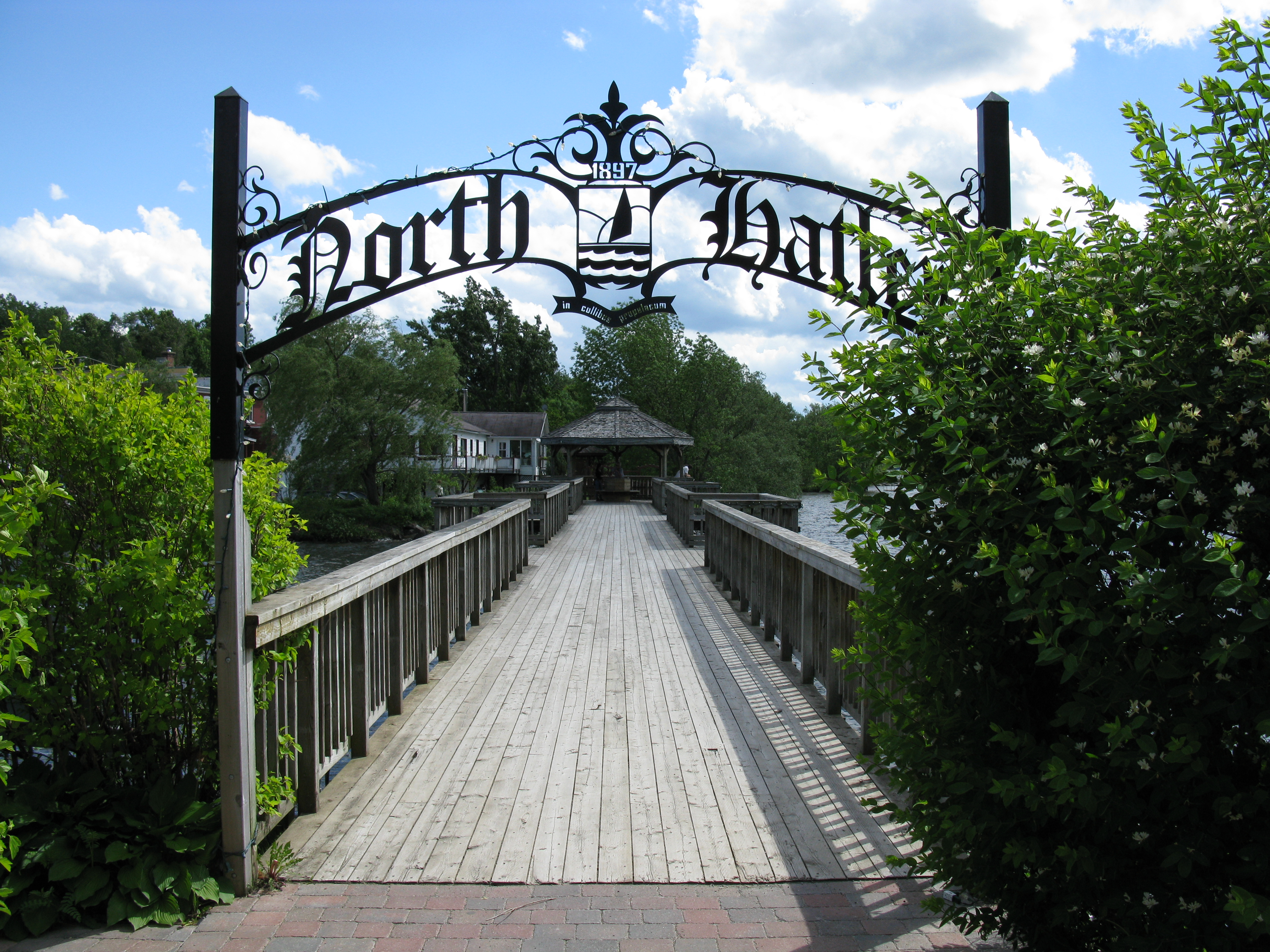
A pier on Lake Massawippi in North Hatley.

A popular summer destination for wealthy Americans in the late-19th and early-20th centuries, industrialist Foxhall P. Keene, writer Upton Sinclair, and the Barron family (of Barron's Magazine) were among those who owned seasonal estates on the lake.

Today Lake Massawippi is the site of two luxury hotels — Hovey Manor and the Ripplecove Inn.

In 2003, French President Jacques Chirac spent his summer holiday on the lake at Hovey Manor, a luxury hotel renowned for its gastronomy. In recent years, American President Bill Clinton has been a frequent visitor.

== See also ==
- Tomifobia River
- Massawippi River
- Memphrémagog Regional County Municipality (RCM)
