= Province Island =

Island in Quebec, Canada

Province
Native name: Île de la Province
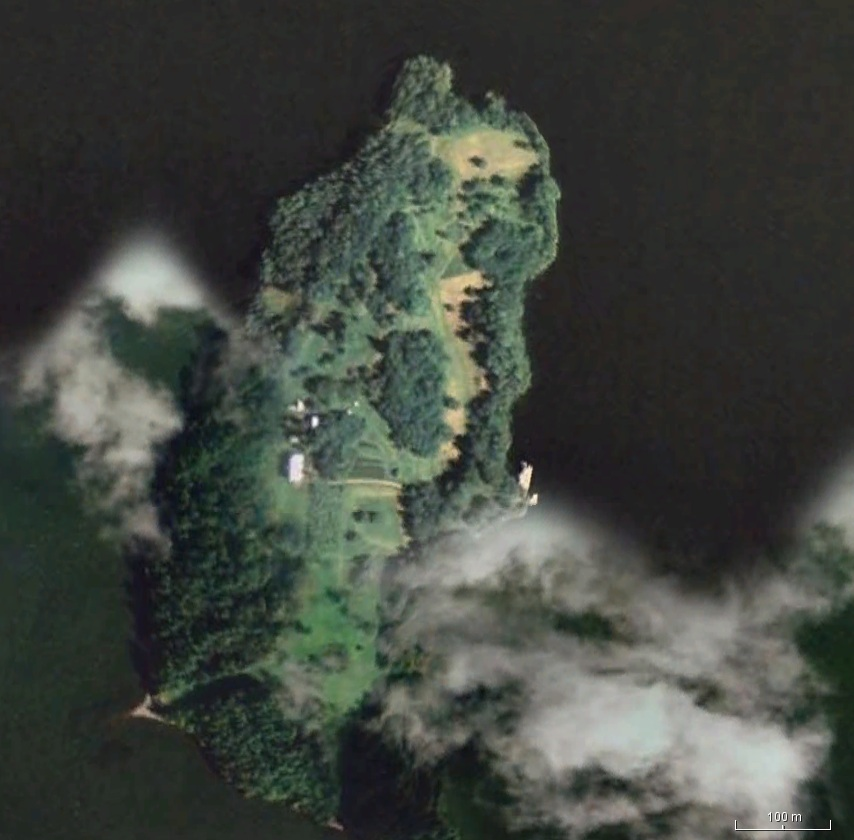
- Aerial view by NASA

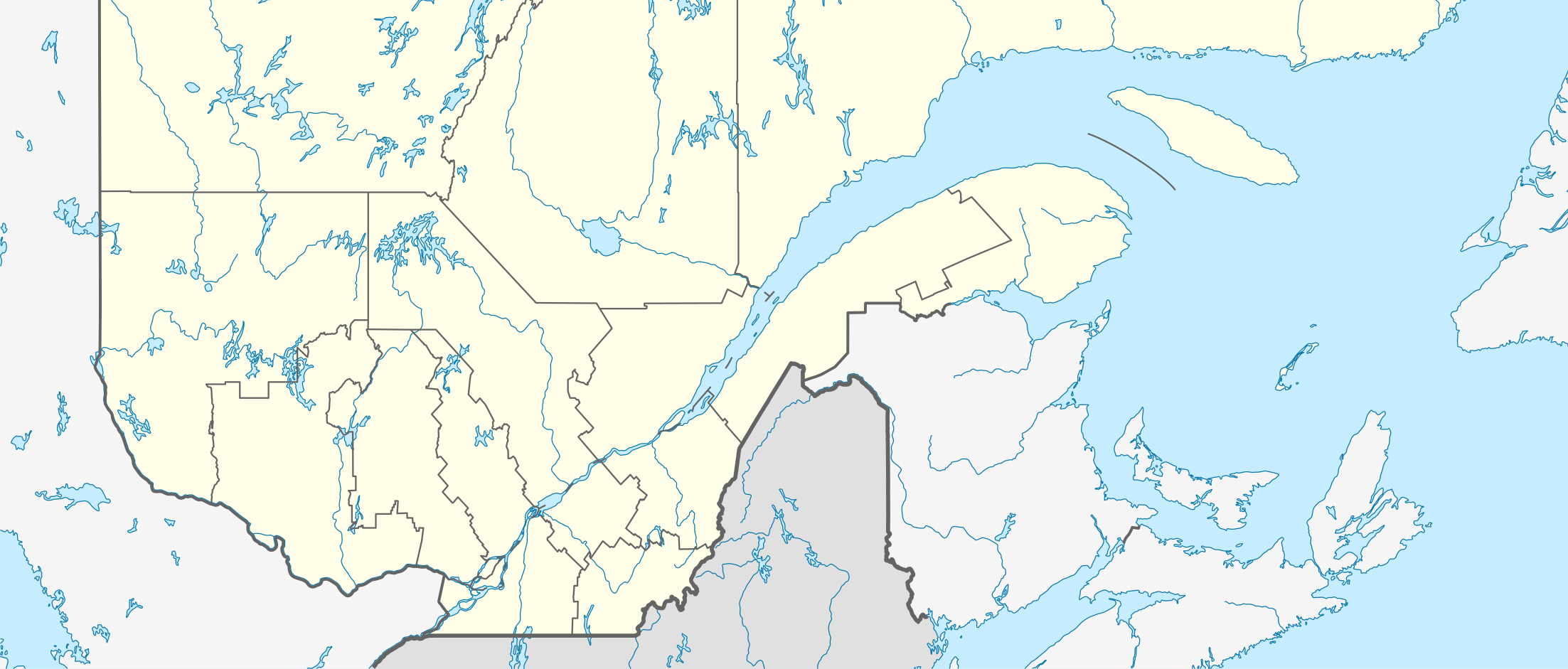
- Location within Quebec South Location within Southern Quebec Location within Quebec Location within Vermont Location within Canada Location within the United States

Geography
- Location: Lake Memphremagog
- Coordinates: 45°00′34″N 72°13′57″W
- Area: 0.31 km^{2} (0.12 sq mi)

Administration
- Canada
- Province: Quebec
- United States
- State: Vermont

Province Island (French: Île de la Province) is an island mostly in the Canadian province of Québec, but partly in the U.S. state of Vermont. It is situated in Lake Memphremagog. The island's area is 31 ha (77 acres). Although 2.8 ha (6.9 acres) (9%) at its southern point is part of the United States (in the town of Derby, Vermont), the greater part belongs to the municipality of Ogden, Quebec, in Memphrémagog Regional County Municipality, Quebec. At the end of the 18th century, a pioneer named Martin Adams and his wife built a house on the island, where they grew flax and vegetables. It is under private ownership; a pheasant hunt is organized annually. The Canada–United States border is marked by a five-meter strip cut through the forest. The island has been noted for its shape's similarity to the country of Taiwan.
