= Hatley, Quebec (historic township) =

Coordinates: 45°10′N 72°05′W

Hatley was a Canadian township (canton) in the Estrie region of Quebec. It was created on 25 March 1803 by publication in the Gazette de Québec, an unofficial publication of the Government of Lower Canada. The territory of the township was later divided, which led to the creation of current Hatley township (municipalité de canton) and Hatley municipality (municipalité), amongst others.

== History ==
Over the years, the territory of Hatley township, created in 1803 and inhabited since 1795, gave rise to different administrative units. In 1845, Hatley Township obtained its letters patent (lettres patentes) but, in 1847 it was abolished again and merged with Stanstead Township. It was re-established in its current form in 1855. From that time on, multiple territories were again detached, creating North Hatley in 1897, Sainte-Catherine-de-Hatley in 1901, Ayer's Cliff in 1909, Hatley village municipality in 1912 and Hatley-Partie-Ouest in 1917. The latter two were merged on 27 September 1995 to form Hatley municipality.
