= Mont Boisjoli =

Mountain in Hatley, Quebec, Canada

- Mont Hatley
- Location within Southern Quebec

Highest point
- Elevation: 350 m (1,150 ft)
- Coordinates: 45°18′08″N 71°56′48″W

Geography
- Location: Hatley, Quebec, Canada
- Topo map: NTS 21E/05

Climbing
- Easiest route: Hiking
- Access: Quebec Route 108

Mont Boisjoli is a hill that rises to approximately 350 metres (1,150 ft) in Hatley, Quebec, Canada.

== History ==
The hill has officially carried the name "Mont Boisjoli" since 1983. In the 1940s, a 150 acres (61 ha) skiing station called Ski Montjoye opened on the hill, and in the 1970s a chalet was constructed to accommodate visitors and events. Eventually, the ski station closed.

Hatley Group, its current owner, purchased the property from the City of Sherbrooke for CA $526,500 in 2009.

== Recreation ==
The hill is open year-round, and hikers may use its trails for free. In the winter, visitors may slide down the mountain using inner tubes or mini-tubes for a fee. According to the Hatley Group website, there are plans to install infrastructure for tri-ski sleds, mini luge, river tubing, and to extend the hiking trails in the park.
