= Lake Memphremagog =

Lake on the border of Vermont and Quebec

- Lac Memphrémagog
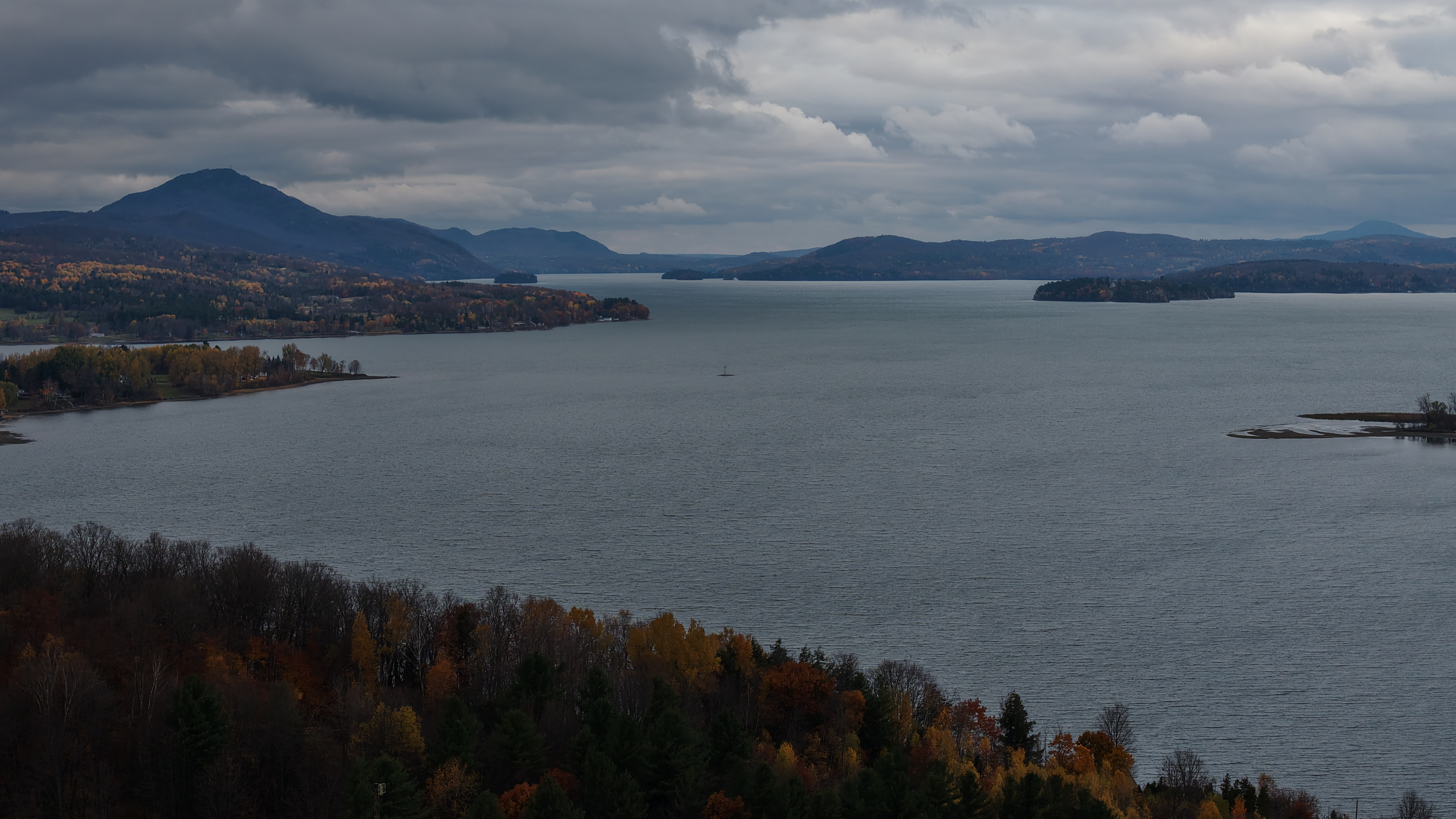
- Lake Memphremagog from the south

- Location within Vermont Location within Quebec Location within the United States Location within Canada
- Location: Memphrémagog Regional County Municipality, Quebec, Canada; Orleans County, Vermont, United States
- Coordinates: 45°0′18″N 72°13′53″W
- Primary inflows: (clockwise from the mouth) Johns River (Vermont), Clyde River (Vermont), Barton River (Vermont), Black River (Vermont), Cherry River (Quebec)
- Primary outflows: Magog River
- Catchment area: 1,777 km^{2} (686 sq mi)
- Basin countries: Canada / United States
- Max. length: 51 km (32 mi)
- Surface area: 110 km^{2} (42 sq mi)
- Average depth: 15.5 m (51 ft)
- Max. depth: 107 m (351 ft)
- Surface elevation: 208 m (682 ft)
- Islands: 21

Lake Memphremagog (mem-frə-MAY-gog; French: Lac Memphrémagog, pronounced [lak mɛmfʁemaɡɔɡ]) is a freshwater glacial lake located between Newport, Vermont, United States and Magog, Quebec, Canada. The lake spans both Quebec and Vermont, but is mostly in Quebec. Most of the watershed that feeds the lake is located in Vermont, and is a source for accumulated phosphorus, sediments, and other pollutants. Cleanup efforts since the late 1980s have improved the water quality. The lake furnishes potable water for 200,000 people.

== Physical characteristics ==
The lake is 31 miles (50 km) long with 73 percent of the lake's surface area in Quebec, where it drains into the Magog River. However, three-quarters of its watershed, 489 square miles (1,270 km^{2}), is in Vermont. The total is 687 square miles (1,780 km^{2}), with 198 square miles (510 km^{2}) located in Quebec. In Vermont, the lake lies in parts of the towns of Derby and Newport, in addition to the City of Newport, all in Orleans County. In Quebec, the lake lies in parts of Austin, Magog, Ogden, Potton, Saint-Benoît-du-Lac, and Stanstead Township, all in Memphrémagog Regional County Municipality. The lake occupies most of what the Vermont Agency of Natural Resources calls "Basin 17". At the very south end of the lake, there is the South Bay, connected by the narrowest part of the lake.

The lake elevation is approximately 682 feet (208 m) above mean sea level. The lake level is set in the treaty signed in 1935 between the United States and Canada and is controlled by the dam on the Magog River at the northern end of the lake. Both ends of the lake are fairly shallow, with depth ranges of 20 feet (6.1 m) to 30 feet (9.1 m). The lake bottom takes a dramatic drop in Canada, starting opposite Mont Owl's Head and continuing that way north to Gibraltar Point, where it starts to climb back to the shallows of the north end. Its maximum recorded depth of 351 feet (107 m) is located in Canada, opposite Jewett Point (at approximately 45.111621°N 72.278491°W). The lake is the third deepest in Vermont. It contains 21 islands. Province Island, the largest, is divided by the international border. The lake is irregular in shape, and along its shores are several striking indentations, in some places low, and in some other parts high and rocky. Along the western shore of the lake are several mountains, prominent among which are Owl's Head, Elephantis, and the Hog's Back.

=== Islands ===
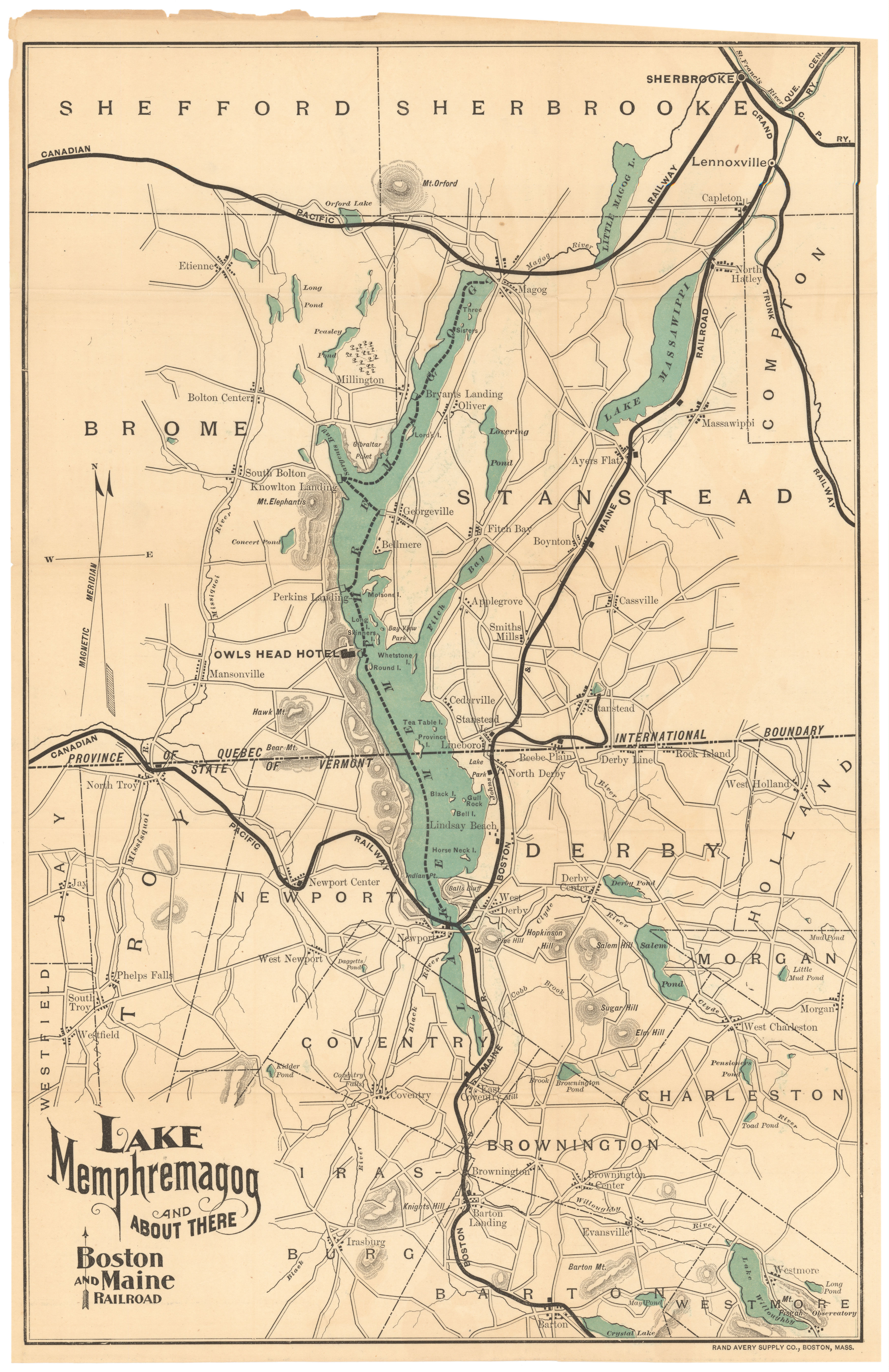
1901 map of Lake Memphremagog

There are 21 islands on Lake Memphremagog. Of these, five are in the United States, one is international, and 15 are in Canada. Many of the islands have had several names throughout history; the current names are provided.

==== Islands in the United States ====
- Horseneck Island (at approximately 44.964724°N 72.202708°W) is the southernmost island on the lake and is near the eastern shore.
- Bell Island (at approximately 44.991006°N 72.209435°W) is one of the Twin Sister islands (the other being Black Island) and is south of Gull Rocks and Black Island.
- Gull Rocks (at approximately 44.993100°N 72.213430°W) is north of Bell Island and south of Black Island.
- Black Island (at approximately 44.995945°N 72.209696°W) is one of the Twin Sister islands (the other being Bell Island) and is north of Gull Rocks and Bell Island.
- Cove Island (at approximately 44.996791°N 72.204096°W) is east of Black Island.

==== International Islands ====
- Province Island (at approximately 45.008640°N 72.232398°W) is crossed by the international boundary. About one tenth of the southern end of the island is in the United States; the remainder is in Canada.

==== Islands in Canada ====
- Tea Table Island (at approximately 45.014670°N 72.221026°W) is north-northeast of Province Island, west of Reid Bay, and south of the Cedarville Wharf.
- Round Island (at approximately 45.044951°N 72.270706°W) is near the western shore of the lake.
- Whetstone Island (at approximately 45.053054°N 72.235773°W) is on the eastern shore at the entrance to Fitch Bay and is south of Gull Island. It is named for the novaculite oil stone (sold as "Magog Oil Stone") that was mined there.
- Gull Island (at approximately 45.058500°N 72.233473°W) is north of Whetstone Island and at the entrance to Fitch Bay.
- Loon Island (at approximately 45.076915°N 72.219525°W) is in Fitch Bay.
- Minnow Island (at approximately 45.058754°N 72.264065°W) is east of Skinner's island. The island is primarily composed of granite.
- Skinner's Island (at approximately 45.059246°N 72.266790°W) is west of Minnow Island and south of Long Island.The island is primarily composed of granite.
- Long Island (at approximately 45.065680°N 72.268839°W) is north of Skinner's Island.
- Molson's Island (at approximately 45.095514°N 72.270728°W) is on the eastern shore.
- Lord's Island (at approximately 45.173796°N 72.238638°W).
- Eagle Island (at approximately 45.236088°N 72.184592°W) is north of Hermitage Point and west of Hermitage Bay.
- Three Sisters (at approximately 45.245123°N 72.178455°W, 45.245822°N 72.177972°W, and 45.247726°N 72.176727°W) are three small islands that are grouped together.
- Charest Island (at approximately 45.263381°N 72.160739°W) is the northernmost island on the lake and is in Magog, Quebec.

=== Hydrology ===
Four Vermont rivers directly empty into the lake: the Clyde, Barton, the Black and the Johns River.

In the middle of the winter, the ice on the lake can become 3 feet (0.9 m) thick.

The Magog River, in Quebec, drains the lake towards the northeast. The hydroelectric-producing Memphemagog Dam, on the Magog River, regulates the water level of the lake. Its level is governed by a treaty signed in 1935 between the United States and Canada.

=== Geology ===
During the ice age, the lake was a proglacial lake which covered Lake Magog, Lake Brompton, and much of the Saint François watershed including East Angus, Sherbrooke, and Windsor.

=== Ecology ===
Like many other lakes, Memphremagog is accumulating phosphorus, sediments, and other pollutants, primarily runoff from farms, but from other sources as well. Exotic species infestations are a concern, with an existing Eurasian water milfoil population and the potential for a zebra mussel infestation. Since the 1970s, significant efforts have been made to reduce the polluting effects of direct discharges into the lake and its tributaries, and lake quality has improved.

In 1994, the Lake Memphremagog Watershed Association was formed to focus on solving lake and river issues. Testing done in 2008 was unable to determine the cause of excessive nitrogen and phosphorus. In 2010, a study revealed that farms contribute disproportionately to nutrient loads. Although farms have 16% of total land use in the drainage area, they produce 44% of the runoff. Baseline nutrients for a lake are 14 micrograms of phosphorus per litre of water. The lake was measured at 17 micrograms, 18% above the standard. Although the acreage devoted to farming has decreased, the retired land has most often been developed, itself a source of runoff.

In 2026, a clonally transmissible melanoma was identified among brown bullhead catfish in the lake.

== Origin of name ==
The lake is within the larger territory originally inhabited by the Abenaki tribe. The lake's name, Memphremagog, is derived from the Algonkian language:

- Memphremagog comes from the word Memrahabegek, which means "where there is a big expanse of water".
- Memphremagog was also pronounced as "Mamphremagog". This came from the Abenakis' Mamlawbagak which signifies "a long and large sheet of water". The prefix mamlaw denotes largeness or abundance; the particule baga denotes water; and "k" marks the name as given in local term.

== History ==
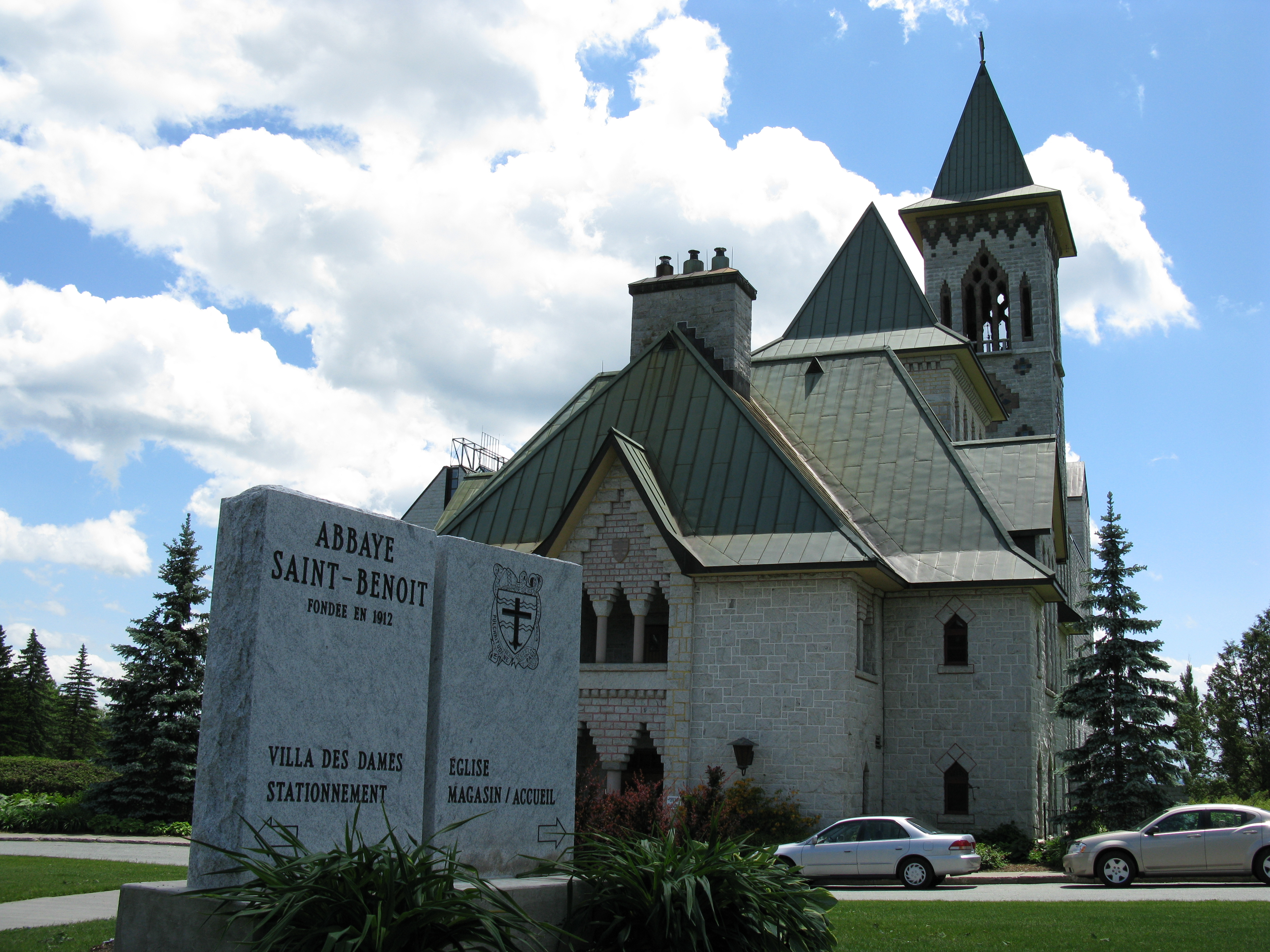
Saint-Benoît-du-Lac Abbey is located in the village of Saint-Benoît-du-Lac, Quebec. The village is on the western shore of Lake Memphremagog.

In 1753, the Abenakis brought the ransomed John Stark down the lake and came ashore where Newport is now.

Rogers' Rangers were forced to retreat south following their attack on Saint-Francis, Quebec in 1759. To confound their avenging pursuers, they split up on the east shore of the lake.

The first accurate depiction of the map was in 1776. This marks the beginning of interest by settlers.

In November 1927, a major flood occurred representing the largest ever in northern Vermont. Although the amount of storage provided by the numerous lakes and ponds in both basins reduces the potential of floods.

In June 1942, a single-engined Royal Canadian Air Force training plane crashed into the lake near the west shore near Newport, killing the pilot, Roy N. Pate, its only occupant.

In 2010, the U.S. Fish and Wildlife Service accepted a bequest of 420 acres (170 ha) of undeveloped land on the shores the lake on Eagle Point along the border with Canada.

In September 2020, a leak at the sewage treatment facility in Newport, Vermont dumped about 7,000 gallons of effluent into the lake.

=== Steamships ===
The Mountain Maid paddlewheeler operated from 1850 to 1870. Officially launched on June 27, 1850, it had a wooden hull that was about 100 feet (30 m) to 105 feet (32 m) long and 19 feet (5.8 m) in breadth. It was originally named the Rhoda Ann and renamed to the Mountain Maid in 1851. The captain was George W. Fogg. It carried passengers and cargo, operating from Newport to Magog with six stops in between. The ship was scrapped in 1892.

The Lady of the Lake was an iron hulled steam excursion/ferry sidewheeler. It was launched in late September, 1867. The ship made the trip from Newport to Magog in 3 hours, including stops. Usually, it made two trips daily. It was retired in 1915 and stopped operations in 1917. It was based in Newport.

The Anthemis steamer was built in 1909 to carry 300 people. It was in operation until 1953.

The steamer Minnie operated in the 1870s. The Memphremagog (later renamed the Magog) operated in the 1880s; it was larger than the Mountain Maid. Other smaller steamers offered ferry, freight and cargo, and towing services on the lake.

=== Memphre ===
Lake Memphremagog allegedly contains a cryptid named Memphre (or Memphré), which has received sightings since the 18th century and continues on in the folklore of the area. A sighting of Memphre was reported in 2000.

== Lighthouses ==
Lake Memphremagog is known to have had at least three lighthouses on the Vermont side and seven on the Quebec side. These were used in aiding boaters in navigating the waters of the large lake.

=== Vermont lighthouses ===
All three of the original lighthouses have been demolished.

==== Maxfield Point Light ====
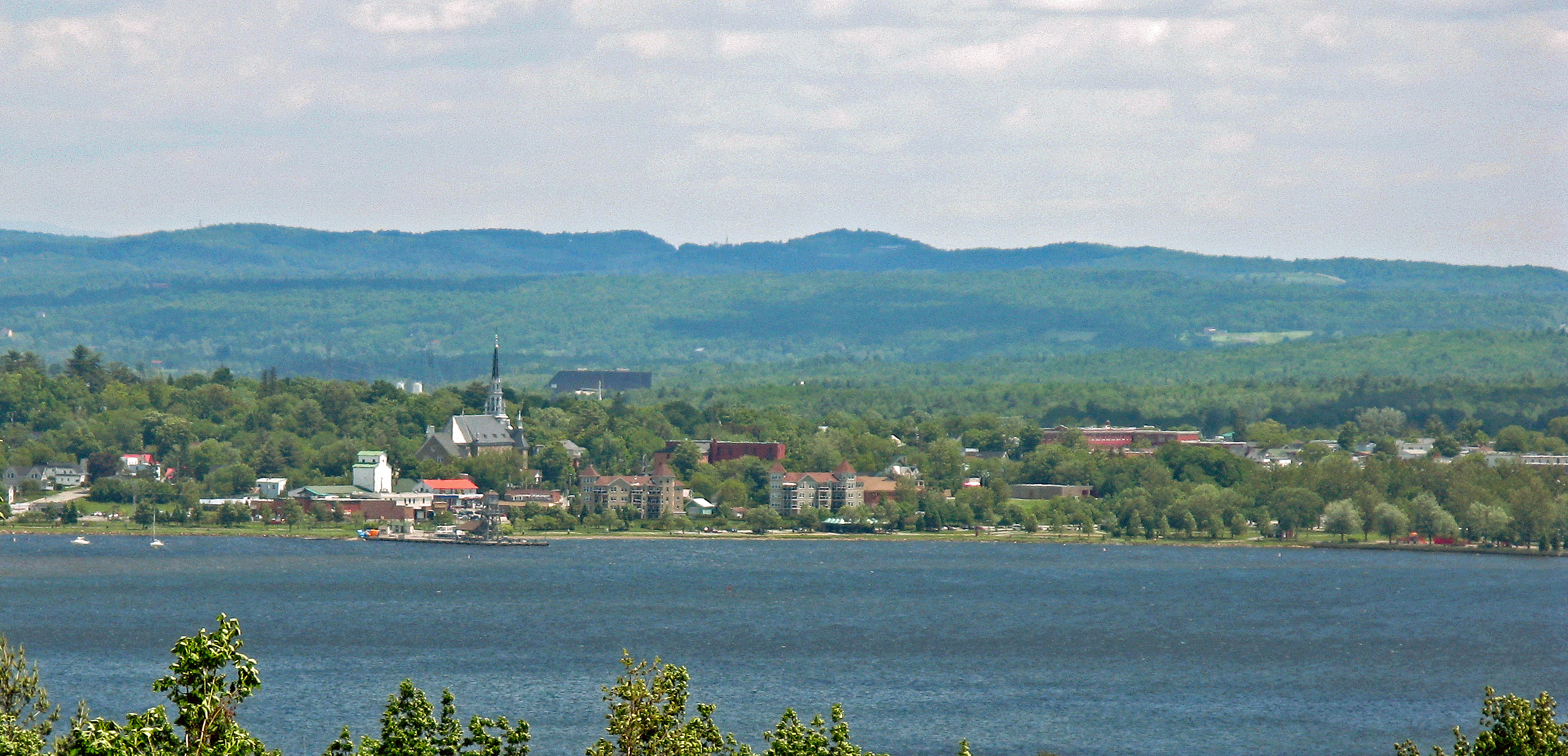
The small city of Magog, Quebec

The Maxfield Point Light was a small lighthouse constructed on the Vermont side of Lake Memphremagog in 1879. A conical, cast iron structure, it was 25 feet (7.6 m) tall, with a focal plane 40 feet (12.2 m) above sea level. It showed a fixed white light, visible for 10 (16 km) miles. The lighthouse no longer exists; it is unknown what happened to it, or when it was deactivated.

==== Newport Wharf Light ====
The Newport Wharf Light was a tower that was built in the Newport section of Lake Memphremagog in 1879. The lighthouse was a steel skeleton tower, painted red, that was fixed on a concrete foundation. The tower showed a fixed red light that was visible for up to 12 mi (19 km), with the height of the focal plane being 37 feet (11.2 m). As with the Maxfield Point Lighthouse, the date this lighthouse was demolished is unknown.

==== Whipple Point Light ====
Whipple Point Light was a tower that was built on the end of a pier on Whipple Point in Lake Memphremagog. Built in 1879, the tower was constructed of wood in a hexagonal shape and stood 13 feet (4 m). The light was fixed white and was visible from up to 10 mi (16 km) away, with a focal plane of 25 feet (7.6 m). The lighthouse was deactivated around 1906 and was demolished at an unknown date.

=== Quebec lighthouses ===
Most of the Quebec lighthouses were originally established in 1878. None of the original lighthouses have survived, although some of them have been replaced by simple navigation lights. From north to south, the lighthouses were:

==== Magog Lighthouse ====
Magog Lighthouse was located on a freight shed and had a fixed red light with a range of 8 miles (13 km). It was built in 1910 and located near Magog. It was demolished on an unknown date.

==== Witch Shoal Lighthouse ====
Witch Shoal Lighthouse was located about 0.5 miles (0.80 km) southwest of Magog. The original lighthouse was built in 1878 as a 21 feet (6.4 m) white square wooden tower on a pier. It had a fixed white dioptric light located at a height of 19 feet (5.8 m) above the high water mark and with a range of 9 miles (14 km). It was rebuilt in 1900. In April 1933, it was destroyed by pressure from the ice caused by the rising level of the lake. It was rebuilt in 1960 as a small metal tower, which was swept away by spring ice in 1978. Since 1980, the mast that replaced it is left in place only from May to October each year. The tower is 23 feet (7.0 m) high with a fixed white light that has a range of 9 miles (14 km) and a focal plane of 28 feet (8.5 m). The aid is owned by the Coast Guard and maintained by a private contractor.

==== Black Point Lighthouse ====
Black Point Lighthouse was located on the western side of the lake, about 3 miles (4.8 km) southwest from Witch Shoal lighthouse. It was also known as the Green Point Lighthouse. It was built in 1878 as a 22-foot (6.7 m) white square wooden tower. It had a fixed white catoptric light located at a height of 24 feet (7.3 m) above the high water mark and with a range of 8 miles (13 km). It had a focal plane of 22 feet (6.7 m). It was rebuilt in 1914 and is currently in a dilapidated state.

==== Wadleigh's Point Lighthouse ====
Wadleigh's Point Lighthouse was located on the western side of the lake, about 4 miles (6.4 km) southwest of Black Point lighthouse. It was also known as the Bryant Landing Light and was near Austin. The original lighthouse was built in 1878 as a 22-foot white square wooden tower with a fixed white catoptric light located at a height of 30 feet (9.1 m) above the high water mark and with a range of 8 miles (13 km). In approximately 1914, that was replaced by a square pyramidal skeletal tower with enclosed lantern. In 1939, that was replaced by a 18 feet (5.5 m) square skeletal tower with enclosed lantern. In 1980, that was replaced by a modern 22 feet (6.7 m) steel tower with a fixed white light that has a range of 8 miles (13 km). The still-active light is installed from May to October each year.

==== Château de Silva Lighthouse ====
Château de Silva Lighthouse was located on the western side of the lake at the Revere House (formerly the Château de Silva) hotel wharf, approximately 5 miles (8.0 km) southwest of the Wadleigh's Point lighthouse. It was built in 1878 as a 22 feet (6.7 m) white square wooden tower with a fixed white catoptric light located at a height of 20 feet (6.1 m) above the high water mark and with a range of 8 miles (13 km). The light had a focal plane of 20 feet (6.1 m). It was demolished on an unknown date.

==== Molson's Island Lighthouse ====
Molson's Island Lighthouse was located on the southwest point of Molson's Island, approximately 2 miles (3.2 km) southeast of the Chateau de Silva lighthouse. This was on the eastern side of the lake, near Georgeville. It was built in 1878 as a 22 feet (6.7 m) white square wooden tower with a fixed white catoptric light located at a height of 28 feet (8.5 m) above the high water mark and with a range of 8 miles (13 km). The light had a focal plane of 28 feet (8.5 m). It was rebuilt in 1914 and demolished on an unknown date. The light was replaced with a lighted buoy.

==== Lead Mines Lighthouse ====
Lead Mines Lighthouse was located on the western side of the lake, approximately 4 miles (6.4 km) southwest of the Molson's Island lighthouse. This was near Leadville, at the foot of Mount Owl's Head. It was built in 1878 as a 22 feet (6.7 m) white square wooden tower with a fixed white catoptric light located at a height of 20 feet above the high water mark and with a range of 8 miles (13 km). The light had a focal plane of 22 feet (6.7 m). It was rebuilt in 1914 and demolished on an unknown date.

== Economy ==
The watershed in Vermont is largely agricultural and forest land with residential development increasing in recent years in both Vermont and Quebec.

The lake furnishes potable (drinking) water for 200,000 people.

In 2011, a day cruise ship started summer operations on the Canadian side of the lake.

== Environmental issues ==
=== Water quality ===
The Vermont portion of Lake Memphremagog does not meet applicable water quality standards, despite a $10 million investment from federal and state agencies in clean water projects from 2016-2021. 2021 data for water quality, aquatic invasive species, and cyanobacteria reveal that Lake Memphremagog is still impaired, but trends are stabilizing.

== Sargent's Bay Yacht Club ==
Sargent's Bay Yacht Club, despite its name, is a small children's dinghy sailing club based out of Sargent's Bay. It operates throughout eight weeks of the summer, hosting up to 40 campers a week, with a staff of five to seven. It was started in 1935 by several families in the bay, with the goal of teaching their children the basics of the sport they all cherished so much, sailing. Since 1935, the Fisher family has graciously allowed the operation of the club to continue on their property.

== Popular culture ==
Lake Memphremagog is mentioned in a novel by Chris Bohjalian, Close Your Eyes, Hold Hands, in which the lake is the site of a nuclear reactor that has suffered a cataclysmic meltdown.

Lake Memphremagog is mentioned in Northwest Passage, a historical novel by Kenneth Roberts about the 1759 Rogers' Rangers raid. In Northwest Passage, the 1940 film based on the novel, Spencer Tracy uses a map that shows Lake Memphremagog and the environs.

The 1986 film The Decline of the American Empire was shot at Lake Memphremagog from September to October 1985.

The Canadian band The Tragically Hip mentions Lake Memphremagog in their 2002 unreleased song "Problem Bears", part of their In Violet Light album sessions.

Lake Memphremagog was mentioned and depicted in Disappearances, a 2006 film by director Jay Craven starring Kris Kristofferson, and co-starring Charlie McDermott and Geneviève Bujold.

Fictional versions of the lake appear in Howard Frank Mosher's books about the Northeast Kingdom of Vermont, including God's Kingdom (St. Martin's Press, 2015).

Lake Memphremagog was the setting for the climactic scene in Kenneth Butler's satiric novel Holy Fool (TouchPoint Press, 2015).

== See also ==
- Memphre (Lake Monster)
