= List of anglophone communities in Quebec =

This is a list of anglophone communities in the Canadian province of Quebec. Municipalities with a high percentage of English-speakers in Quebec are listed.

The provincial average of Quebecers whose mother tongue is English is 7.6%, with a total of 639,365 people in Quebec who identify English as their mother tongue in 2021. The majority of anglophones in Quebec live in the western suburbs of Montréal and in Western Quebec. While most communities in these areas have sizeable English minorities, several municipalities have anglophone majorities.

Municipality	Type	Regional County Municipality	Total population	Percentage of population whose mother tongue is English
Austin	Municipality	Memphrémagog	1,748	13%
Ayer's Cliff	Village	Memphrémagog	1,180	32%
Baie-D'Urfé	Town	Montréal	3,764	51%
Beaconsfield	Town	Montréal	19,277	49%
Bedford	Town	Brome-Missisquoi	2,558	20%
Blanc-Sablon	Municipality	Le Golfe-du-Saint-Laurent	1,122	75%
Bolton-Est	Municipality	Memphrémagog	1,108	24%
Brigham	Municipality	Brome-Missisquoi	2,282	10%
Bristol	Municipality	Pontiac	1,199	74%
Brossard	City	Longueuil	91,525	12%
Brownsburg-Chatham	Town	Argenteuil	7,247	14%
Bury	Municipality	Le Haut-Saint-François	1,252	26%
Candiac	City	Roussillon	22,997	9%
Cantley	Municipality	Les Collines-de-l'Outaouais	11,449	12%
Châteauguay	City	Roussillon	50,815	25%
Chelsea	Municipality	Les Collines-de-l'Outaouais	8,000	43%
Chisasibi	Cree village	Eeyou Istchee	4,985	8%
Clarenceville	Municipality	Le Haut-Richelieu	1,154	23%
Clarendon	Municipality	Pontiac	1,392	82%
Cleveland	Township	Le Val-Saint-François	1,581	25%
Compton	Municipality	Coaticook	3,270	10%
Cookshire-Eaton	Town	Le Haut-Saint-François	5,344	19%
Côte-Saint-Luc	City	Montréal	34,504	40%
Cowansville	Town	Brome-Missisquoi	15,234	15%
Deux-Montagnes	Town	Deux-Montagnes	17,915	12%
Dollard-des-Ormeaux	City	Montréal	48,403	38%
Dorval	Town	Montréal	19,302	41%
Dunham	Town	Brome-Missisquoi	3,599	18%
Durham-Sud	Municipality	Drummond	1,051	8%
Eeyou Istchee Baie-James	Municipality	Jamésie	2,638	9%
Fort-Coulonge	Village	Pontiac	1,312	16%
Franklin	Municipality	Le Haut-Saint-Laurent	1,635	21%
Frelighsburg	Municipality	Brome-Missisquoi	1,123	18%
Gaspé	Town	La Côte-de-Gaspé	15,063	10%
Gatineau	City	Gatineau	291,041	12%
Godmanchester	Township	Le Haut-Saint-Laurent	1,403	38%
Gore	Township	Argenteuil	2,283	18%
Gracefield	Town	La Vallée-de-la-Gatineau	2,376	10%
Grenville	Village	Argenteuil	1,816	12%
Grenville-sur-la-Rouge	Municipality	Argenteuil	2,883	26%
Hampstead	Town	Montréal	7,037	55%
Hatley	Township	Memphrémagog	2,230	20%
Hemmingford	Township	Les Jardins-de-Napierville	1,995	29%
Hinchinbrooke	Municipality	Le Haut-Saint-Laurent	2,187	49%
Hudson	Town	Vaudreuil-Soulanges	5,411	60%
Huntingdon	Town	Le Haut-Saint-Laurent	2,556	38%
Kazabazua	Municipality	La Vallée-de-la-Gatineau	1,037	41%
Kirkland	Town	Montréal	19,413	39%
Kitigan Zibi	Indian reserve	None	1,204	65%
Kuujjuaq	Northern village	Kativik	2,668	11%
L'Ange-Gardien	Municipality	Les Collines-de-l'Outaouais	6,102	9%
L'Île-Perrot	Town	Vaudreuil-Soulanges	11,638	25%
L'Isle-aux-Allumettes	Municipality	Pontiac	1,382	76%
La Pêche	Municipality	Les Collines-de-l'Outaouais	8,636	37%
Lac-Brome	Town	Brome-Missisquoi	5,923	40%
Lachute	Town	Argenteuil	14,100	9%
Lacolle	Municipality	Le Haut-Richelieu	2,680	9%
Léry	Town	Roussillon	2,390	13%
Les Cèdres	Municipality	Vaudreuil-Soulanges	7,184	9%
Listuguj	Indian reserve	None	1,523	68%
Low	Township	La Vallée-de-la-Gatineau	1,020	53%
Mansfield-et-Pontefract	Municipality	Pontiac	2,250	18%
Melbourne	Township	Le Val-Saint-François	1,096	26%
Mille-Isles	Municipality	Argenteuil	1,721	17%
Mistissini	Cree village	Eeyou Istchee	3,731	13%
Mont-Royal	City	Montréal	20,953	17%
Mont-Tremblant	Town	Les Laurentides	10,992	8%
Montreal	City	Montréal	1,762,949	13%
Montréal-Ouest	Town	Montréal	5,115	56%
Morin-Heights	Municipality	Les Pays-d'en-Haut	4,678	17%
New Carlisle	Municipality	Bonaventure	1,336	57%
New Richmond	Town	Bonaventure	3,683	13%
Notre-Dame-de-l'Île-Perrot	Town	Vaudreuil-Soulanges	11,427	22%
Notre-Dame-du-Nord	Municipality	Témiscamingue	1,090	14%
Noyan	Municipality	Le Haut-Richelieu	1,418	17%
Ormstown	Municipality	Le Haut-Saint-Laurent	3,917	31%
Otter Lake	Municipality	Pontiac	1,041	56%
Percé	Town	Le Rocher-Percé	3,095	21%
Pincourt	Town	Vaudreuil-Soulanges	14,751	35%
Pointe-à-la-Croix	Municipality	Avignon	1,344	15%
Pointe-Claire	City	Montréal	33,488	47%
Pointe-des-Cascades	Village	Vaudreuil-Soulanges	1,775	13%
Pontiac	Municipality	Les Collines-de-l'Outaouais	6,142	37%
Port-Daniel–Gascons	Municipality	Le Rocher-Percé	2,271	13%
Potton	Township	Memphrémagog	2,012	38%
Rawdon	Municipality	Matawinie	11,719	9%
Richmond	City	Le Val-Saint-François	3,259	21%
Rigaud	Town	Vaudreuil-Soulanges	7,854	20%
Rosemère	Town	Thérèse-De Blainville	14,090	12%
Saint-Anicet	Municipality	Le Haut-Saint-Laurent	2,754	15%
Saint-Armand	Municipality	Brome-Missisquoi	1,228	23%
Saint-Bernard-de-Lacolle	Municipality	Les Jardins-de-Napierville	1,542	10%
Saint-Clet	Municipality	Vaudreuil-Soulanges	1,700	9%
Saint-Lambert	City	Longueuil	22,761	12%
Saint-Lazare	City	Vaudreuil-Soulanges	22,354	36%
Sainte-Anne-de-Bellevue	Town	Montréal	5,027	43%
Sainte-Marthe	Municipality	Vaudreuil-Soulanges	1,014	14%
Shawville	Municipality	Pontiac	1,668	83%
Stanstead	Town	Memphrémagog	2,824	51%
Stanstead	Township	Memphrémagog	1,148	31%
Stukely-Sud	Village	Memphrémagog	1,142	13%
Sutton	Town	Brome-Missisquoi	4,548	24%
Témiscaming	Town	Témiscamingue	2,368	34%
Terrasse-Vaudreuil	Municipality	Vaudreuil-Soulanges	1,887	26%
Très-Saint-Sacrement	Parish	Le Haut-Saint-Laurent	1,189	40%
Val-des-Monts	Municipality	Les Collines-de-l'Outaouais	13,328	11%
Vaudreuil-Dorion	City	Vaudreuil-Soulanges	43,268	23%
Vaudreuil-sur-le-Lac	Village	Vaudreuil-Soulanges	1,361	19%
Waterloo	Town	La Haute-Yamaska	4,920	13%
Waterville	Town	Coaticook	2,307	24%
Wemindji	Cree village	Eeyou Istchee	1,562	14%
Wentworth-Nord	Municipality	Les Pays-d'en-Haut	1,672	14%
Westmount	Town	Montréal	19,658	49%

A number of small municipalities also have high anglophone populations. These include the anglophone-majority municipalities of Alleyn-et-Cawood (63%), Bonne-Espérance (98%) Brome (57%), Bryson (54%), Campbell's Bay (62%), Cascapédia-Saint-Jules (53%), Chichester (84%), Côte-Nord-du-Golfe-du-Saint-Laurent (67%) Elgin (56%), Gesgapegiag (66%), Gros-Mécatina (96%), Grosse-Île (82%), Harrington (51%), Hope Town (57%), Kebaowek (86%), Laforce (59%), Litchfield (64%), Portage-du-Fort (89%), Rapides-des-Joachims (57%), Saint-Augustin (97%), Sheenboro (83%), Shigawake (58%), Thorne (71%), Timiskaming First Nation (81%), Waltham (82%) and Winneway (80%).

Small anglophone-minority municipalities include Abercorn (32%), Arundel (36%), Aumond (8%), Barkmere (25%), Barnston-Ouest (27%), Bedford (23%), Boileau (14%), Bolton-Ouest (47%), Bowman (13%), Denholm (28%), Dixville (8%), Dundee (27%), East Farnham (18%), East Hereford (10%), Eastmain (11%), Escuminac (24%), Estérel (17%), Hatley (31%), Havelock (22%), Hemmingford (39%), Hope (15%), Howick (27%), Ivry-sur-le-Lac (24%), Kawawachikamach (10%), Kinnear's Mills (9%), Kipawa (43%), Kuujjuarapik (15%), L'Île-Cadieux (21%), L'Île-du-Grand-Calumet (33%), Lac-Sainte-Marie (22%), Lac-Tremblant-Nord (25%), Lantier (11%), Lingwick (12%), Matapédia (19%), Mayo (24%), Métis-sur-Mer (10%), Montcalm (20%), Mulgrave-et-Derry (32%), Namur (9%), Nédélec (10%), Nemaska (9%), Newport (28%), North Hatley (37%), Ogden (49%), Pike River (10%), Pikogan (18%), Pointe-Fortune (13%), Ristigouche-Sud-Est (21%), Saint-Benoît-du-Lac (33%), Saint-Damase-de-L'Islet (9%), Saint-Godefroi (10%), Saint-Herménégilde (8%), Saint-Ignace-de-Stanbridge (13%), Saint-Godefroi (10%), Saint-Télesphore (10%), Sainte-Justine-de-Newton (9%), Schefferville (12%), Scotstown (10%), Senneville (45%), Stanbridge East (43%), Stanbridge Station (10%), Stanstead-Est (39%), Terrasse-Vaudreuil (26%), Très-Saint-Rédempteur (14%), Ulverton (16%), Warden (14%), Waswanipi (14%), and Wentworth (41%).

== See also ==
- English-speaking Quebecers
- List of Anglo-Quebecer communities
- List of Municipalities in Quebec
