= Hovey Manor =

Canadian hotel

Coordinates: 45.2640°N 71.9953°W

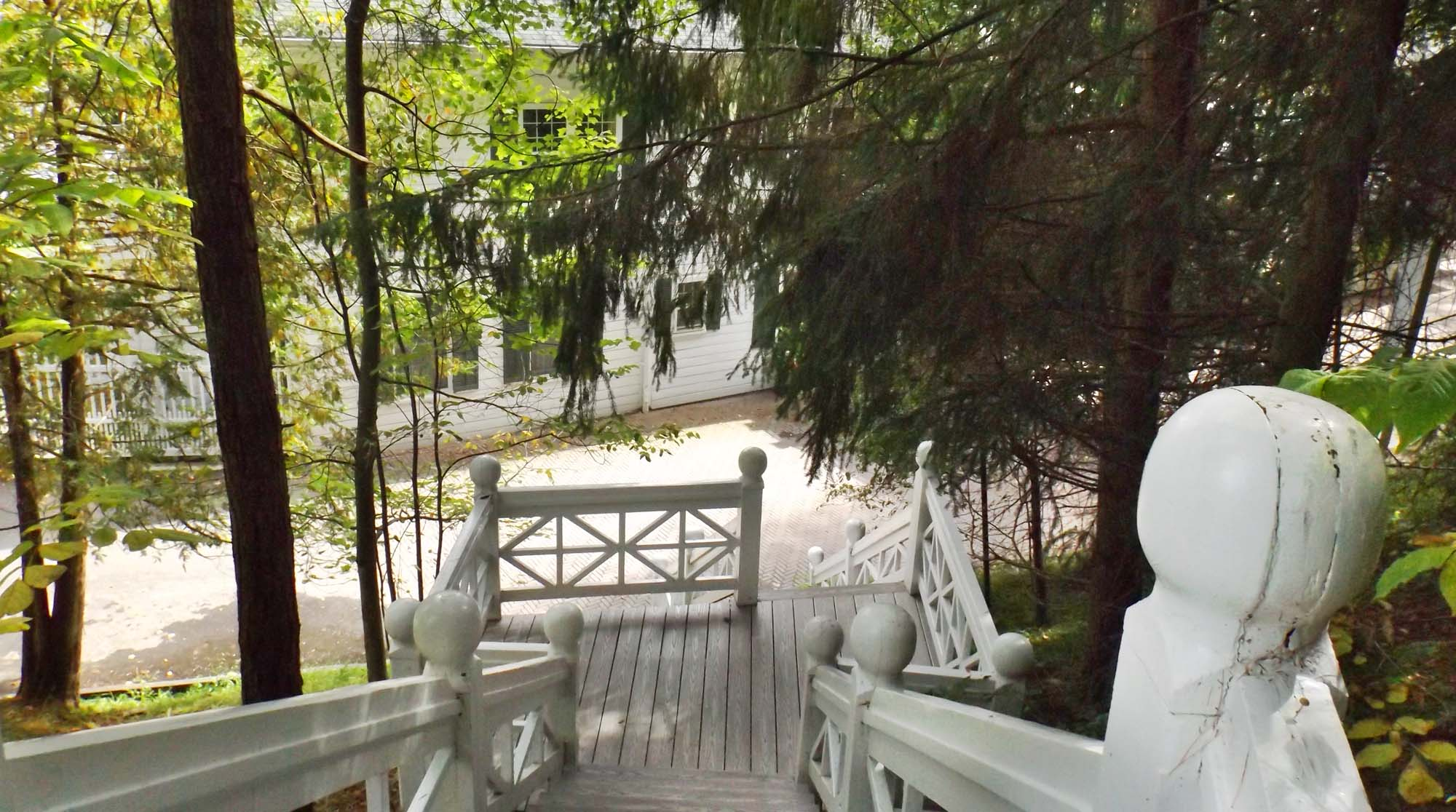
Hotel grounds in 2013

Hovey Manor, or Manoir Hovey /ˈhʌvi/ (in French) is a five-star, 37-bedroom, luxury hotel in North Hatley, Quebec, Canada.

== Location ==
The 37-bedroom hotel's grounds cover 35 acres and has a view of Lake Massawippi.

== History ==
The hotel was initially built as a summer home for Henry Atkinson, the owner of Georgia Power, in 1900. It was converted into a hotel in the 1950s, branded as The Birches, before being renamed Hovey Manor, named after local settler Colonel Ebenezer Hovey. Stephen and Katryn Stafford bought the hotel in 1979, employing the son Jason to manage it in 2000. The hotel is part of the Relais & Châteaux luxury hotel association.

Notable guests include Bill, Hillary, and Chelsea Clinton who visited in 2017 and 2021; also Jacques Chirac and Bernadette Chirac who visited in 2003.

In 2007, the hotel was named one of Canada's top ten hotels in Condé Nast Traveler's Gold List – the only rural property in Eastern Canada to have received the award. In 2014, it is ranked first among the Best Hotels in Eastern Canada in the Condé Nast Traveler: Readers' Choice Awards. In 2016, it was voted Canada's top hotel by both the readers of Condé Nast Traveler magazine, and by Travel & Leisure magazine. Both magazines also stated that the hotel was amongst the fifty best hotels in the world.
