= Saint-Benoît-du-Lac =

- Municipality
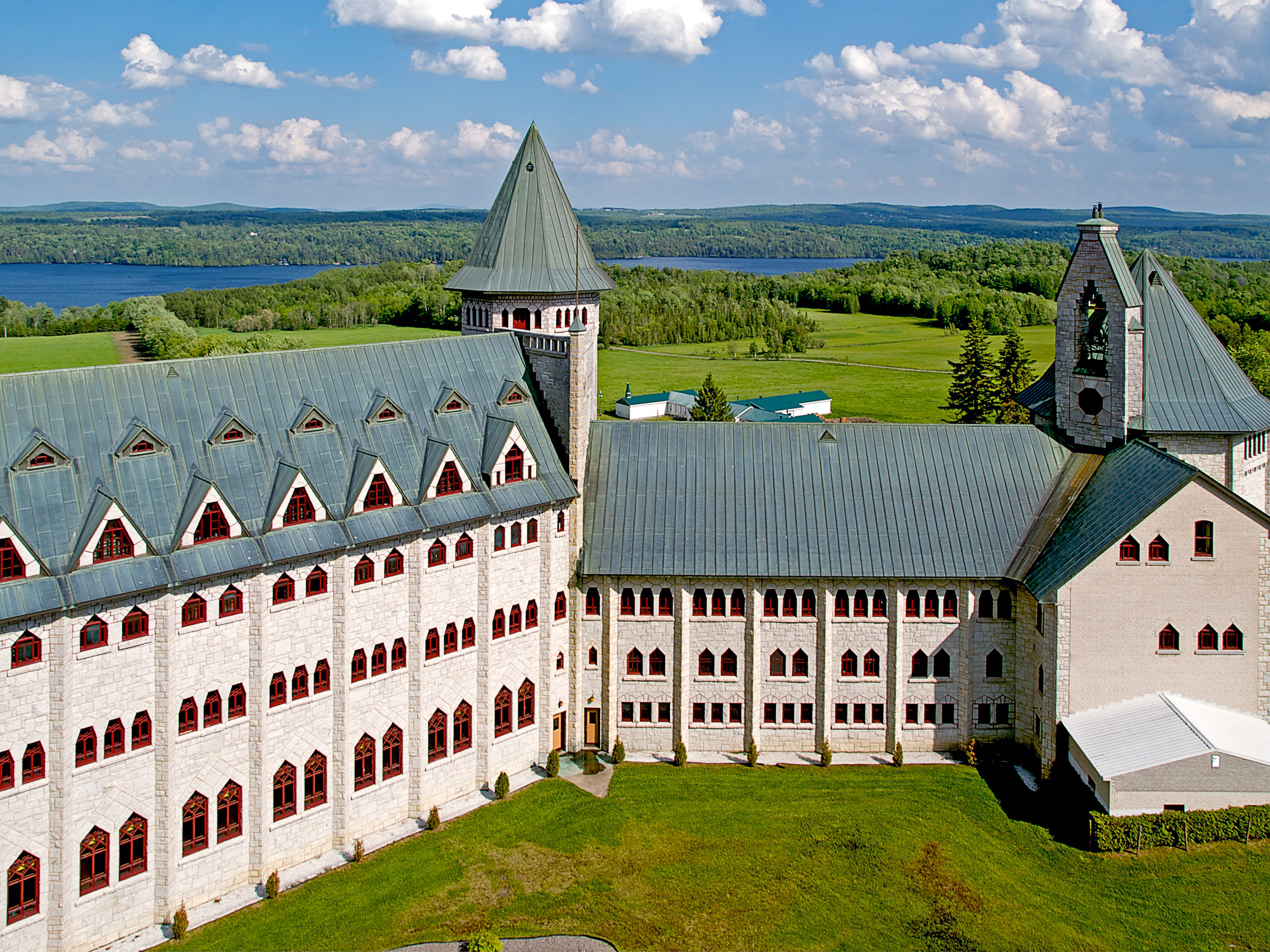
- The abbey at Saint-Benoît-du-Lac.

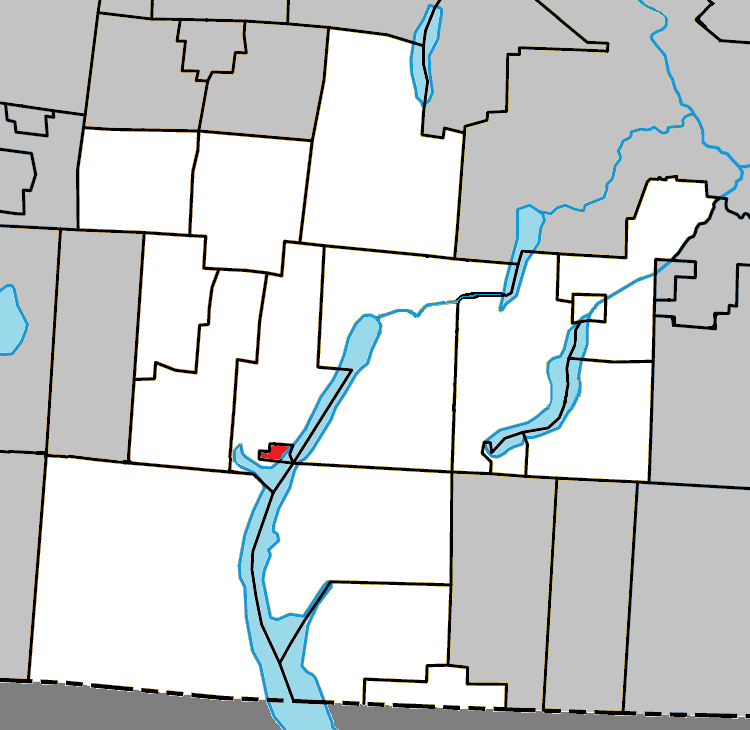
- Location within Memphrémagog RCM.

- Location in southern Quebec.
- Coordinates: 45°10′N 72°16′W
- Country: Canada
- Province: Quebec
- Region: Estrie
- RCM: Memphrémagog
- Constituted: March 16, 1939

Government
  - Administrator: Père André Laberge
  - Federal riding: Brome—Missisquoi
  - Prov. riding: Orford

Area
  - Total: 2.40 km^{2} (0.93 sq mi)
  - Land: 2.18 km^{2} (0.84 sq mi)

Population (2021)
  - Total: 43
  - Density: 19.7/km^{2} (51/sq mi)
  - Pop 2016-2021: ▲34.4%
  - Dwellings: 13
- Time zone: UTC−5 (EST)
  - Summer (DST): UTC−4 (EDT)
- Postal code(s): J0B 2M0
- Area code: 819
- Highways: No major routes
- Website: www.st-benoit-du-lac.com

Saint-Benoît-du-Lac (French pronunciation: [sɛ̃ bənwa dy lak]) is a community of 43 people, part of the Memphrémagog Regional County Municipality in the Eastern Townships region of Quebec. It only comprises an abbey, a cheese making facility, and its immediate surrounding lands.

== History ==
The name Saint-Benoît-du-Lac refers to Benedict of Nursia, founder of the Benedictines. The municipality was founded on March 16, 1939 by splitting away from the municipality of Austin.

== Demographics ==
=== Population ===
Historical census populations – Saint-Benoît-du-Lac

Year	Pop.	±%
1991	57	—
1996	53	−7.0%
2001	47	−11.3%
2006	48	+2.1%

Year	Pop.	±%
2011	50	+4.2%
2016	32	−36.0%
2021	43	+34.4%

Source: Statistics Canada

=== Language ===
Mother tongue (2021)

Language	Population	Pct (%)
French only	30	66.7%
English only	15	33.3%
Non-official languages	0	0%

== See also ==
- Saint Benedict Abbey, Quebec
- List of anglophone communities in Quebec
- List of municipalities in Quebec
