= Saint Benedict Abbey, Quebec =

Building in Quebec, Canada

Coordinates: 45.16635°N 72.271°W

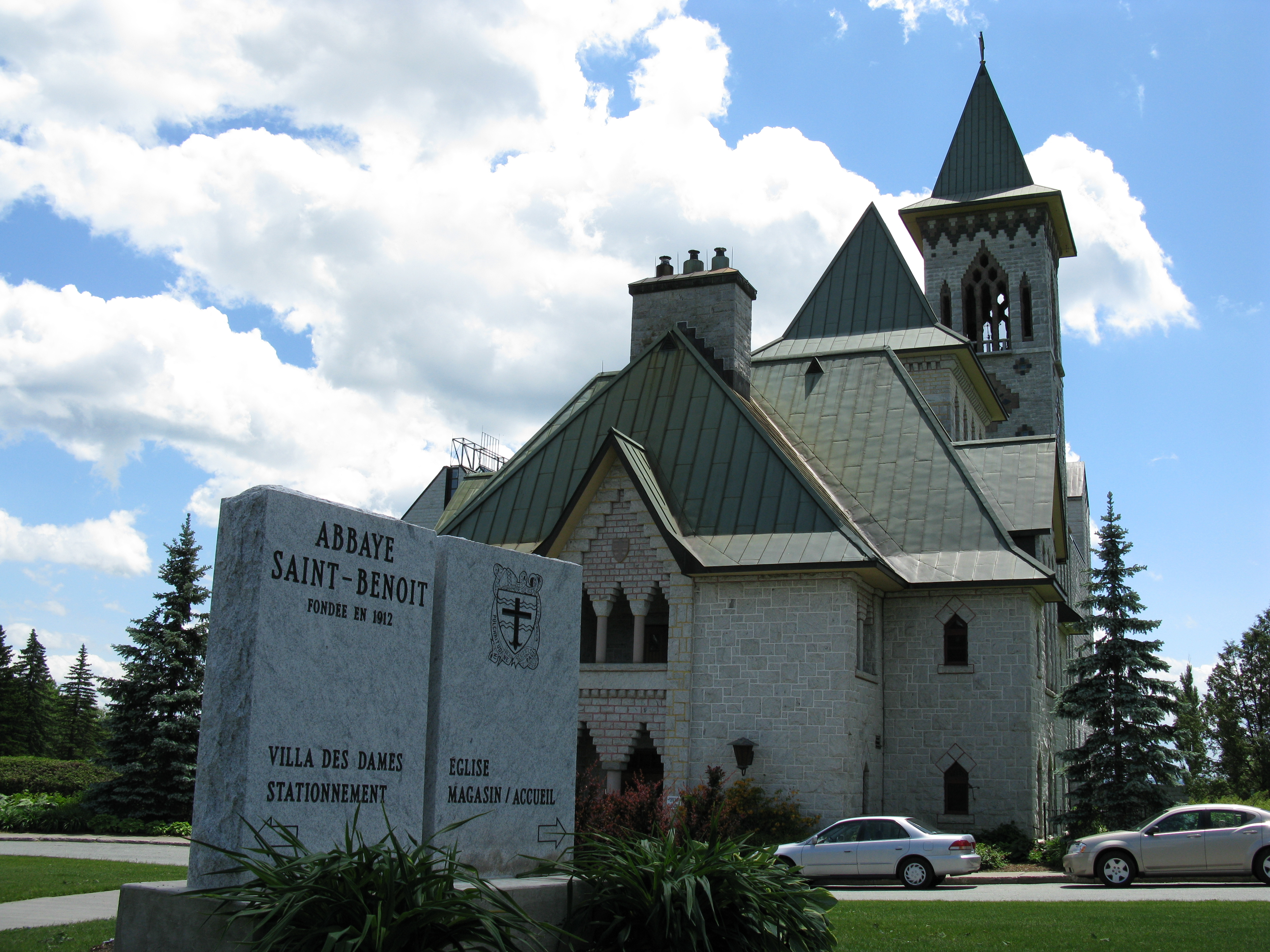
Saint Benedict Abbey.

Saint Benedict Abbey (French: Abbaye Saint-Benoit) is an Abbey in Saint-Benoît-du-Lac, Quebec, Canada, and was founded in 1912 by the exiled (Fontenelle Abbey) of St. Wandrille, France under Abbot Dom Joseph Pothier, liturgist and scholar who reconstituted the Gregorian chant. Father Paul Bellot was the architect 1939–41.

The new priory later became independent within the Solesmes Congregation.

Today it numbers a little more than fifty monks living under the Rule of Saint Benedict. Cloistered from the world, they are enjoined to seek God in the celebration of the liturgy of the Church, in private prayer accompanied by meditation of the Bible and in manual as well as intellectual work. They form a community under the direction of an Abbot.
