= Johns River (Vermont) =

Location
- Country: United States and Canada
- State and Province: Vermont and Quebec
- County of Vermont and RCM of Quebec: Orleans County, Vermont, Northeast Kingdom and Memphremagog Regional County Municipality in Quebec

Physical characteristics
- Source
  - location: Mountain stream, Derby, Vermont, Orleans County, Vermont, US
  - coordinates: 44°58′28″N 72°58′28″W
  - elevation: 1,364 m (4,475 ft)
- Mouth
  - location: Lake Memphremagog, Derby, Vermont ("North Derby" sector), Orleans County, Vermont, US
  - coordinates: 44°59′43″N 72°10′57″W
  - elevation: 679 m (2,228 ft)
- Length: 11.0 km (6.8 mi)

Basin features
- Tributaries
  - right: Crystal Brook

Johns River is a tributary of the Lake Memphremagog, flowing in the municipality of Derby in northern Vermont, in United States and in the municipality of Stanstead (city), Quebec (sector "Beebe Junction") in the Memphremagog Regional County Municipality (RCM), in the administrative region of Estrie, south of Quebec, in Canada.

== Geography ==
Johns River rises on the northwest slope of a mountain "Nelson Hill" in the municipality of Derby, Vermont at the North of Nelson Hill road. This source is located at:

- 0.5 miles (0.80 km) northeast of the radio tower at the top of the mountain;
- 7.1 miles (11.4 km) east of the confluence of the Johns River;
- 3.1 miles (5.0 km) south of the US border.

From its source, the river flows on 11.0 miles (17.7 km) according to the following segments:

- 2.2 miles (3.5 km) to the northwest in the Vermont racing down the mountain on 117 feet (36 m), until the Interstate 91;
- 0.4 miles (0.64 km) to the northwest across the Interstate 91, to Crystal Brook (from the northeast);
- 3.0 miles (4.8 km) to the northwest, up the bridge of Beebe road from the village of "Beebe Plain";
- 1.1 miles (1.8 km) to the northwest, to the border between Quebec and Vermont;
- 1.1 miles (1.8 km) by making a curve to the north in the territory of Quebec in the municipality of Beebe Junction to return cut the boundary again between the Quebec and the Vermont;
- 3.2 miles (5.1 km) too the southwest in the Vermont crossing the North Derby road, up to its confluence

The confluence of the river flows at the bottom of the Derby Bay on the eastern shore of Lake Memphremagog in Vermont.

== History ==
The river was long used to reach the river Connecticut River, via a port that connected the Nulhegan River, a tributary of the river.

== Toponymy ==
The toponym "Johns River" refers to a family surname of English origin; while the term "John" refers to a popular first name of English origin.

This toponym was officialized on October 29, 1980, in the Geographic Names Information System (GNIS) of the US government.

== See also ==
- Lake Memphremagog, a body of water straddling the Quebec and Vermont
- Stanstead (city), Quebec, a city of Quebec
- Derby, Vermont, a municipality of Vermont
- Orleans County, Vermont, a county Vermont
- List of rivers of Vermont
- List of rivers of Quebec
