= Ayer's Cliff =

- Village municipality
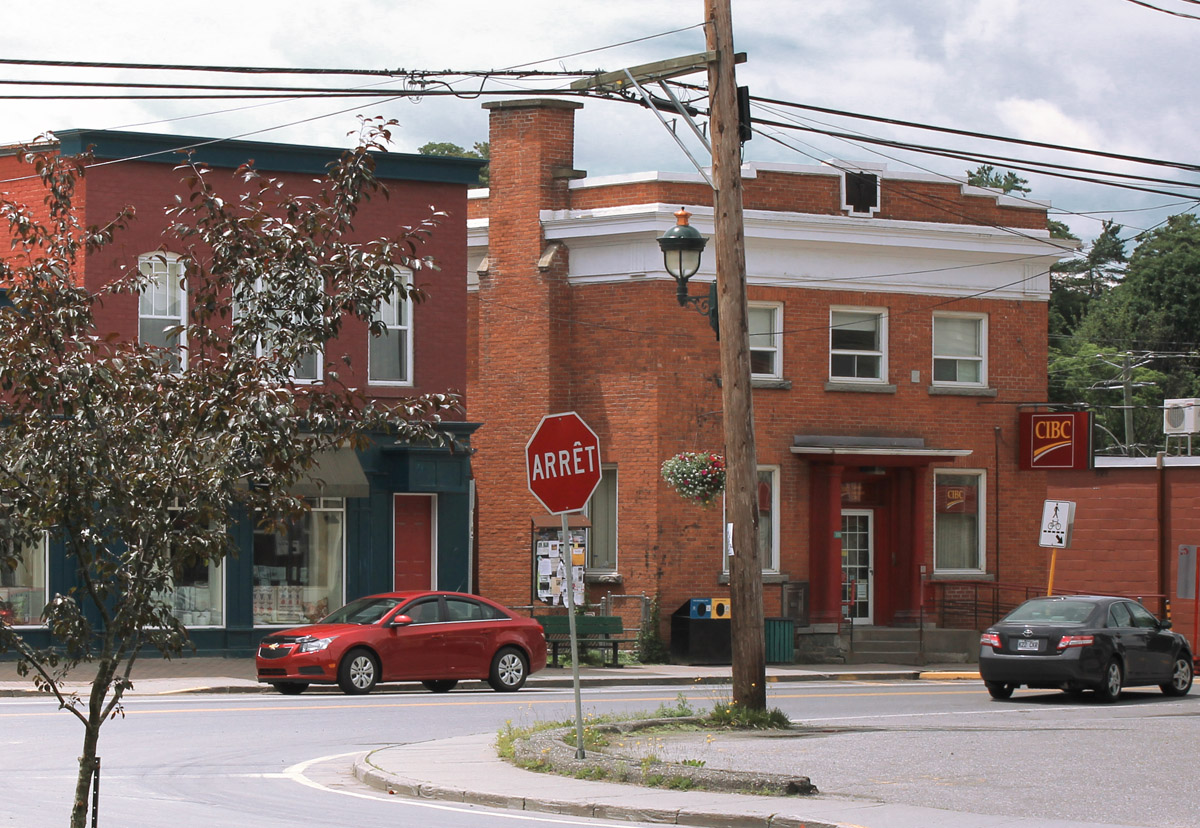

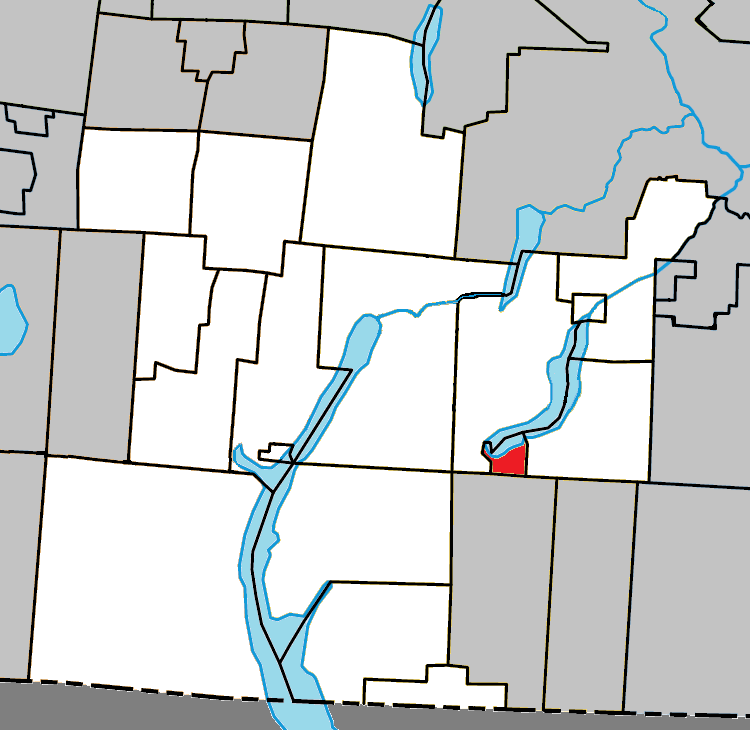
- Location within Memphrémagog RCM.

- Location in southern Quebec.
- Coordinates: 45°10′N 72°03′W
- Country: Canada
- Province: Quebec
- Region: Estrie
- RCM: Memphrémagog
- Settled: 1815
- Constituted: February 4, 1909

Government
  - Mayor: Alec Van Zuiden
  - Federal riding: Compton—Stanstead
  - Prov. riding: Orford

Area
  - Total: 5.50 km^{2} (2.12 sq mi)
  - Land: 5.53 km^{2} (2.14 sq mi)
- There is an apparent contradiction between two authoritative sources

Population (2021)
  - Total: 1,197
  - Density: 213.3/km^{2} (552/sq mi)
  - Pop 2016-2021: ▲10%
  - Dwellings: 643
- Demonym: Ayer's Cliffer
- Time zone: UTC−5 (EST)
  - Summer (DST): UTC−4 (EDT)
- Postal code(s): J0B 1C0
- Area code: 819
- Highways: R-141; R-208
- Census profile
- MAMROT info: 45035
- Toponymie info: 142204
- Website: www.ayerscliff.ca

Ayer's Cliff (2021 population 1,180) is a village municipality in the Memphrémagog Regional County Municipality in the Estrie region of Quebec. It is located just north of the Canada–United States border, on Lake Massawippi, near the mouth of the Tomifobia River.

== History ==
In the early 1910s and 1920s a number of wealthy Americans built summer estates in Ayer's Cliff. These included the railroad mogul Charles Keller Beekman, Chicago attorney David Leavitt Hough, Charles W. Parker, and George Fuller Parker, a close friend of President Grover Cleveland.

Ayer's Cliff still maintains a large anglophone population, with roots going back to the late 18th century. Today, Ayer's Cliff and the surrounding region are home to a combination of seasonal and year-round residents. The village is the site of Ripplecove Inn, a world-renowned luxury resort featured on CTV Travel's Most Romantic Hideaways.

The annual Ayer's Cliff Fair has been a popular gathering place for Eastern Townshippers since 1845. It is a multi-day event that includes animal shows, rides, attractions and entertainment for all.

== Demographics ==
In the 2021 Census of Population conducted by Statistics Canada, Ayer's Cliff had a population of 1,180 living in 531 of its 643 total private dwellings, a change of 10% from its 2016 population of 1,073. With a land area of 5.53 km^{2} (2.14 sq mi), it had a population density of 213.4/km^{2} (552.7/sq mi) in 2021.

Home language (2006)
Language	Population	Pct (%)
English only	610	58.37%
French only	410	39.23%
Both English and French	25	2.39%

Home language (2011)
Language	Population	Pct (%)
English only	475	44.39%
French only	575	53.74%
Both English and French	15	1.40%

Home language (2016)
Language	Population	Pct (%)
English only	417	37.70%
French only	644	58.23%
Both English and French	45	4.07%

Home language (2021)
Language	Population	Pct (%)
English only	415	35.2%
French only	705	59.7%
Both English and French	55	4.7%

== Notable people ==
- During the 1930s, multi-millionaire sportsman Foxhall P. Keene maintained a seasonal residence in Ayer's Cliff where he died in 1941.
- American novelist and essayist Upton Sinclair also spent time in Ayer's Cliff in the 1930s.

== See also ==
- Ayer's Cliff Fair
- List of anglophone communities in Quebec
- List of village municipalities in Quebec
- Tomifobia River
- Wulftec International
