= Austin, Quebec =

Austin
- Municipality
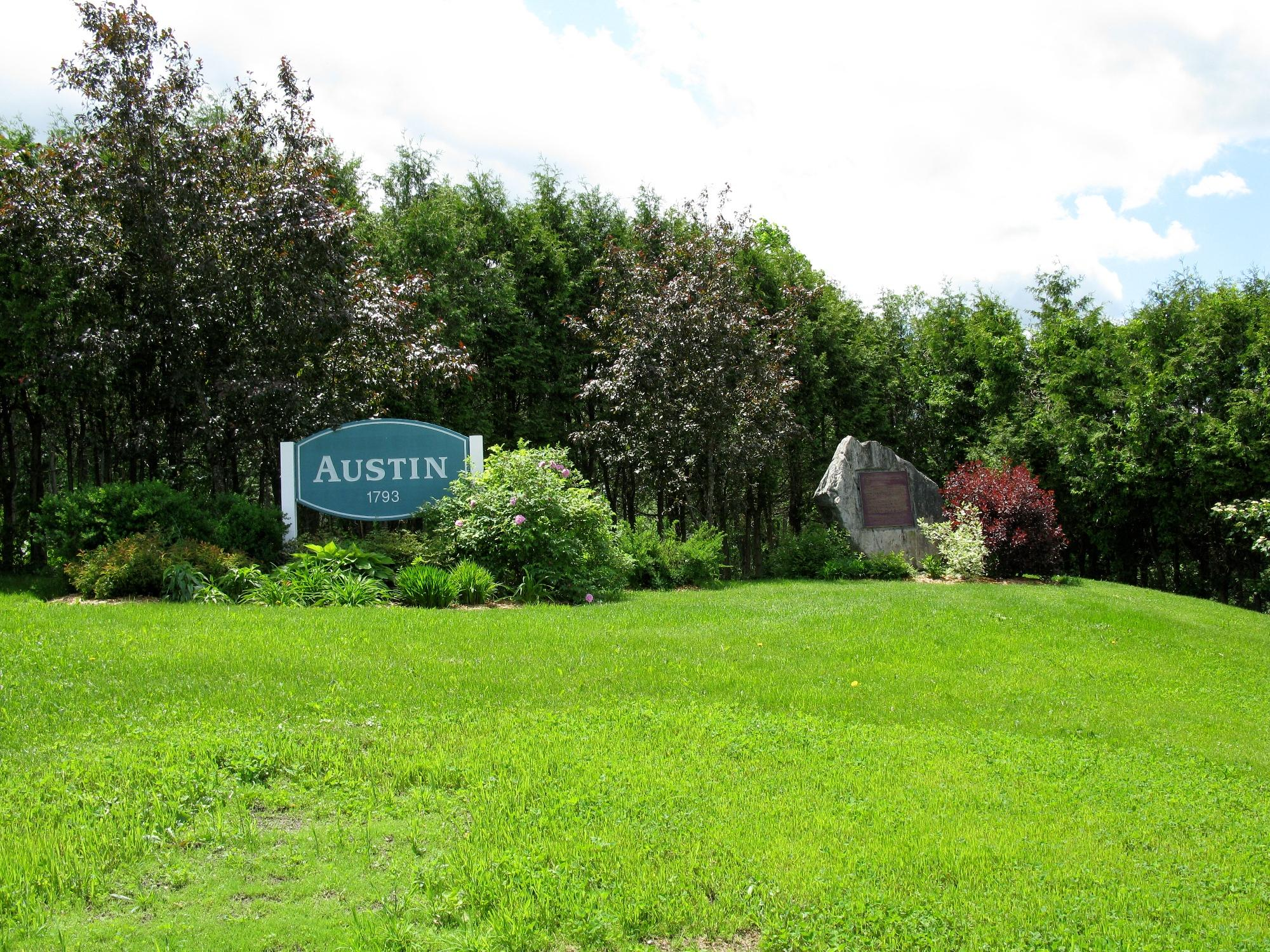

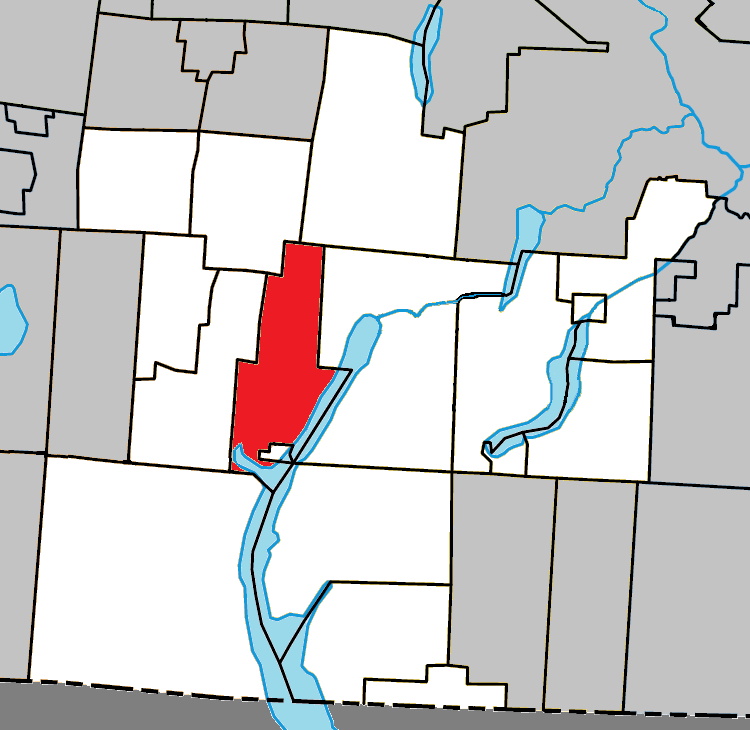
- Location within Memphrémagog RCM

- Location in southern Quebec
- Coordinates: 45°11′N 72°17′W
- Country: Canada
- Province: Quebec
- Region: Estrie
- RCM: Memphrémagog
- Founded: 1793
- Constituted: November 5, 1938

Government
  - Mayor: Lisette Maillé
  - Federal riding: Brome—Missisquoi
  - Prov. riding: Orford

Area
  - Total: 86.50 km^{2} (33.40 sq mi)
  - Land: 73.58 km^{2} (28.41 sq mi)

Population (2021)
  - Total: 1,748
  - Density: 23.8/km^{2} (62/sq mi)
  - Pop 2016-2021: ▲17.7%
  - Dwellings: 1,410
- Time zone: UTC−5 (EST)
  - Summer (DST): UTC−4 (EDT)
- Postal code(s): J0B 1B0
- Area code: 819
- Highways A-10: R-112
- Website: www.municipalite.austin.qc.ca/fr/accueil/

Austin is a municipality on the western shore of Lake Memphremagog, part of the Memphrémagog Regional County Municipality in the Estrie region of Quebec, Canada.

It was home to inventor Reginald Fessenden. It is named after Nicholas Austin who brought the first settlers, mostly Quakers, to this area from the state of New Hampshire in 1796.

== Demographics ==
=== Population ===
Population trend:

Census	Population	Change (%)
2021	1,748	▲17.7%
2016	1,485	▲3.8%
2011	1,430	▲3.8%
2006	1,404	▲16.9%
2001	1,201	▲10.9%
1996	1,083	▲25.3%
1991	864	N/A

=== Language ===
Mother tongue (2021)

Language	Population	Pct (%)
French only	1,435	82.0%
English only	235	13.4%
Both English and French	35	2.0%
Non-official languages	35	2.0%

== See also ==
- List of anglophone communities in Quebec
- List of municipalities in Quebec
