= Barnston West =

- Municipality
- Barnston-Ouest
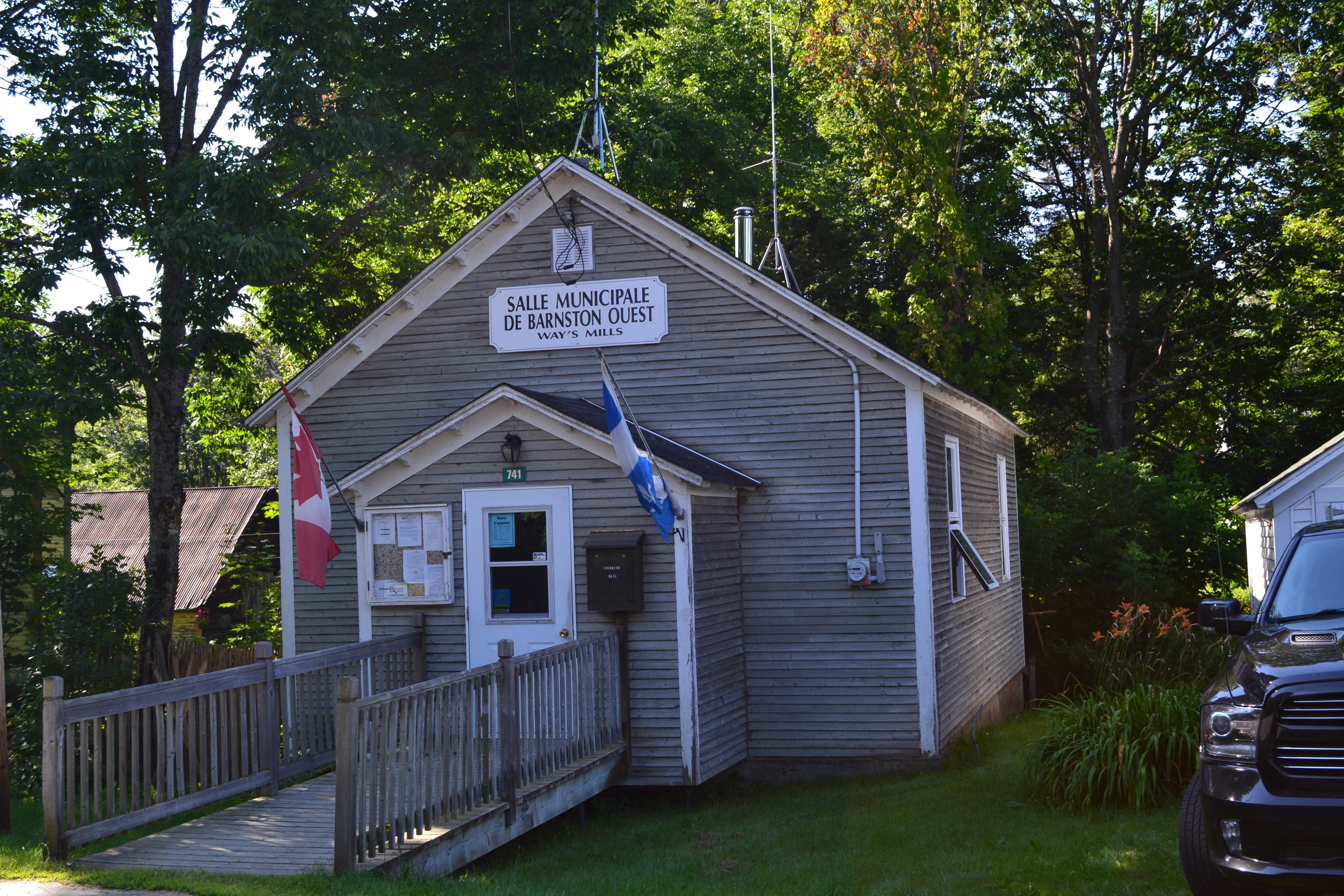
- Municipal office

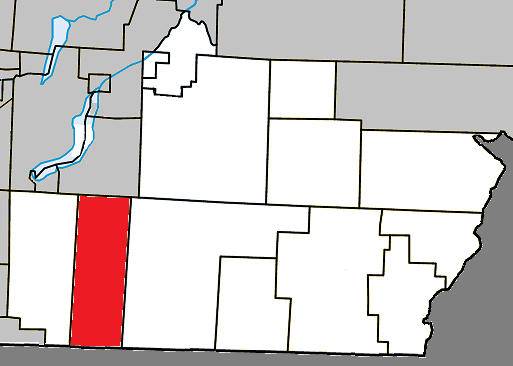
- Location within Coaticook RCM

- Location in southern Quebec
- Coordinates: 45°06′N 71°58′W
- Country: Canada
- Province: Quebec
- Region: Estrie
- RCM: Coaticook
- Constituted: January 1, 1946

Government
  - Mayor: Johnny Piszar
  - Federal riding: Compton—Stanstead
  - Prov. riding: Saint-François

Area
  - Total: 100.10 km^{2} (38.65 sq mi)
  - Land: 100.85 km^{2} (38.94 sq mi)
- There is an apparent contradiction between two authoritative sources

Population (2011)
  - Total: 591
  - Density: 5.9/km^{2} (15/sq mi)
  - Pop 2006-2011: ▲1.4%
  - Dwellings: 282
- Time zone: UTC−5 (EST)
  - Summer (DST): UTC−4 (EDT)
- Postal code(s): J0B 1C0
- Area codes: 819
- Highways: R-141
- Website: www.barnston-ouest.ca

Barnston West (French: Barnston-Ouest) is a municipality within the Coaticook Regional County Municipality in Quebec, Canada, located on the Canada–United States border. It includes the hamlet of Ways Mills.

== Demographics ==
=== Population ===
Population trend:

Census	Population	Change (%)
2011	591	▲1.4%
2006	583	▼2.8%
2001	600	▲0.3%
1996	598	▲2.6%
1991	583	N/A

=== Language ===
Home language (2006)

Language	Population	Pct (%)
French only	340	58.11%
English only	245	41.88%

== Arts and culture ==
The Rozynski Arts Center is located in Barnston-Ouest. The center is centered on the field of contemporary ceramics and offers workshop and outdoor exhibitions.

== See also ==
- List of anglophone communities in Quebec
