= Hatley, Quebec (municipality) =

Hatley
- Municipality
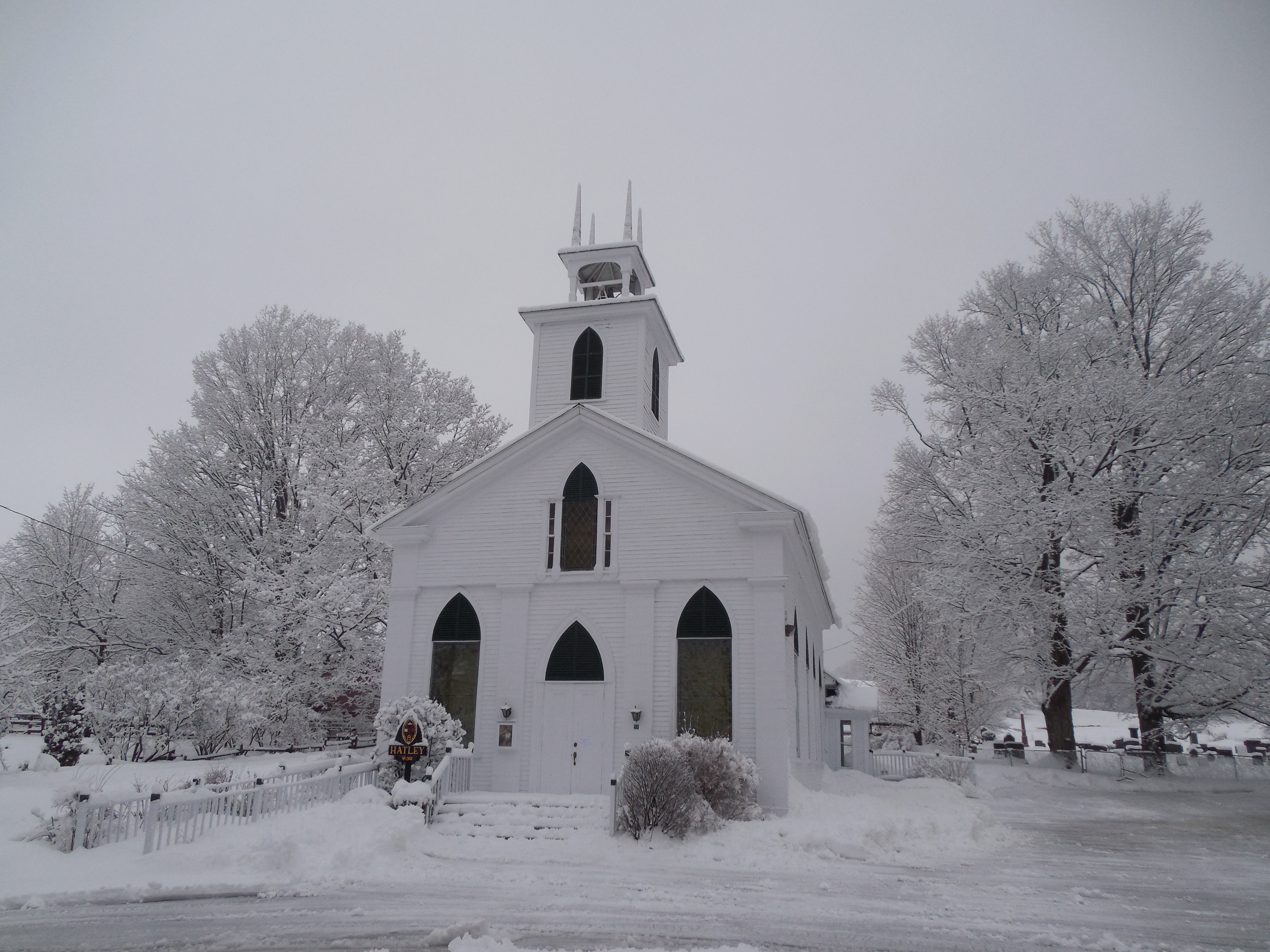
- Hatley United Church on Main St.

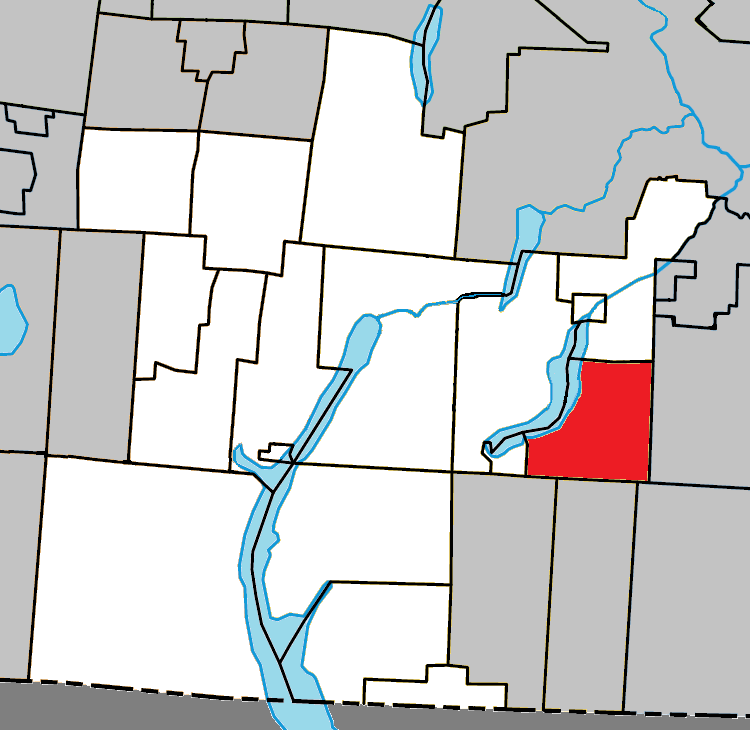
- Location within Memphrémagog RCM

- Location in southern Quebec
- Coordinates: 45°11′N 71°56′W
- Country: Canada
- Province: Quebec
- Region: Estrie
- RCM: Memphrémagog
- Constituted: September 27, 1995

Government
  - Mayor: Pierre Côté
  - Federal riding: Compton—Stanstead
  - Prov. riding: Orford

Area
  - Total: 66.60 km^{2} (25.71 sq mi)
  - Land: 60.43 km^{2} (23.33 sq mi)

Population (2021)
  - Total: 771
  - Density: 12.8/km^{2} (33/sq mi)
  - Pop 2016-2021: ▲12.6%
  - Dwellings: 472
- Time zone: UTC−5 (EST)
  - Summer (DST): UTC−4 (EDT)
- Postal code(s): J0B 4B0
- Area code: 819
- Highways: R-143; R-208
- Website: www.municipalitehatley.com

Hatley is a municipality of about 771 people, in Memphrémagog Regional County Municipality in the Estrie region of Quebec, Canada. It lies to the south of the township municipality of the same name.

An agricultural community, one of Hatley's main claims to fame is its annual Canada Day Celebration which typically takes place in July. Along with a parade (featuring horses, floats, antique cars, tractors, children on decorated bikes and any number of other entrants), the day includes games for children, artisan vendors, a book sale, community lunch, local performers, and ends off with a fireworks display.

== Demographics ==
=== Population ===
Historical Census Data - Hatley, Quebec

Year	Pop.	±%
1991	675	—
1996	642	−4.9%
2001	709	+10.4%

Year	Pop.	±%
2006	777	+9.6%
2011	761	−2.1%
2016	685	−10.0%

Year	Pop.	±%
2021	771	+12.6%

Private dwellings occupied by usual residents: 340 (total dwellings: 472)

=== Language ===
Mother tongue (2021)

Language	Population	Pct (%)
French only	475	61.7%
English only	235	30.5%
Other non-official languages	30	3.9%

== See also ==
- List of anglophone communities in Quebec
- List of municipalities in Quebec
