= Hatley, Quebec (township) =

Hatley Township
- Township municipality
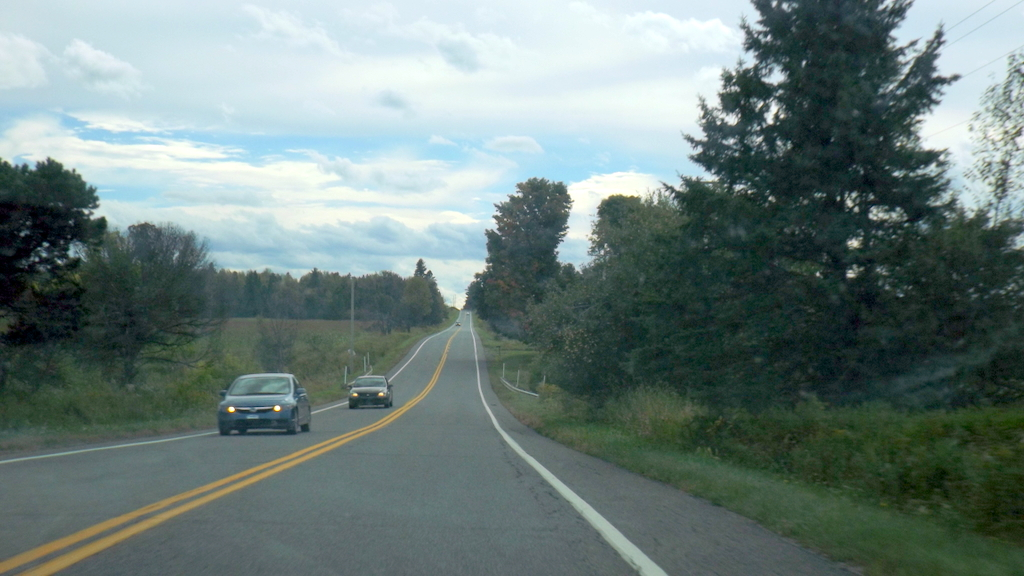

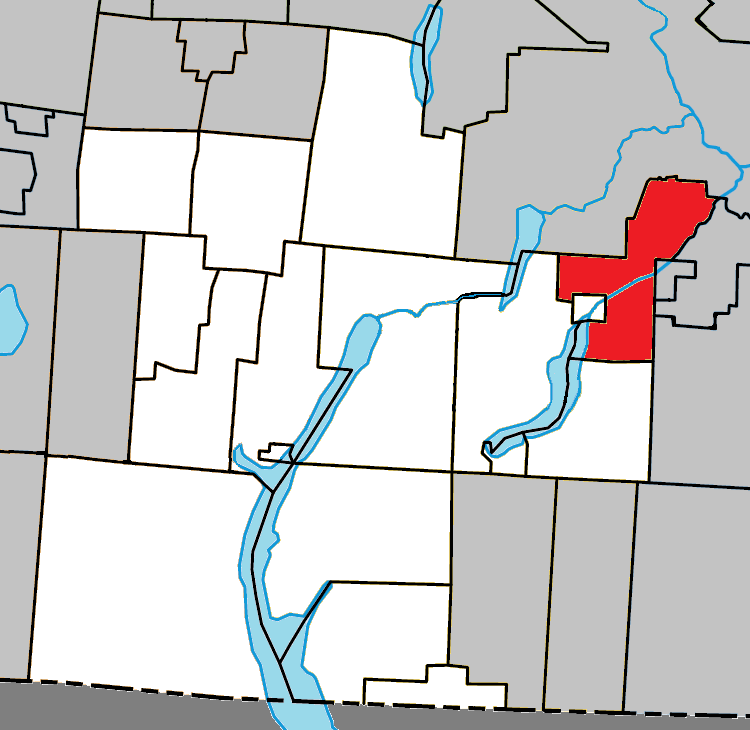
- Location within Memphrémagog RCM

- Location in southern Quebec
- Coordinates: 45°16′N 71°57′W
- Country: Canada
- Province: Quebec
- Region: Estrie
- RCM: Memphrémagog
- Constituted: July 1, 1855
- Named for: Hatley, Cambridgeshire

Government
  - Mayor: Pierre A. Levac
  - Federal riding: Compton—Stanstead
  - Prov. riding: Orford

Area
  - Total: 75.90 km^{2} (29.31 sq mi)
  - Land: 71.60 km^{2} (27.64 sq mi)

Population (2021)
  - Total: 2,230
  - Density: 31.1/km^{2} (81/sq mi)
  - Pop 2016-2021: ▲5.9%
  - Dwellings: 954
- Time zone: UTC−5 (EST)
  - Summer (DST): UTC−4 (EDT)
- Postal code(s): J0B 2C0
- Area code: 819
- Highways: R-108; R-143
- Website: cantondehatley.ca

Hatley is a township in the Memphrémagog Regional County Municipality in the Eastern Townships region of Quebec, Canada. The township had a population of 2,230 as of the Canada 2021 Census.

== Demographics ==
In the 2021 Census of Population conducted by Statistics Canada, Hatley had a population of 2,230 living in 895 of its 954 total private dwellings, a change of 5.9% from its 2016 population of 2,106. With a land area of 71.6 km^{2} (27.6 sq mi), it had a population density of 31.1/km^{2} (80.7/sq mi) in 2021.

== See also ==
- List of anglophone communities in Quebec
- List of township municipalities in Quebec
