= Memphrémagog Regional County Municipality =

Memphrémagog
- Regional county municipality
- Coordinates: 45°16′N 72°05′W
- Country: Canada
- Province: Quebec
- Region: Estrie
- Effective: January 1, 1982
- County seat: Magog

Government
  - Type: Prefecture
  - Prefect: Jacques Demers

Area
  - Total: 1,449.00 km^{2} (559.46 sq mi)
  - Land: 1,319.29 km^{2} (509.38 sq mi)

Population (2016)
  - Total: 50,415
  - Density: 38.2/km^{2} (99/sq mi)
  - Change 2011-2016: ▲3.8%
  - Dwellings: 30,430
- Time zone: UTC−5 (EST)
  - Summer (DST): UTC−4 (EDT)
- Area code: 819
- Website: www.mrc memphremagog.com

Memphrémagog (French pronunciation: [mɛmfʁemaɡɔɡ]) is a regional county municipality in the Estrie region of Quebec, Canada.

== History ==
After the signing of the Treaty of Paris on September 3, 1783, the American Revolutionary War ended. the state of Vermont was established in 1791. The border of Lower Canada was then defined at approximately 45 degrees north latitude. The territory immediately adjacent to it became part of Quebec in 1848.

== Subdivisions ==
There are 17 subdivisions within the RCM:

Cities & Towns (2)

- Magog
- Stanstead

Municipalities (8)

- Austin
- Bolton-Est
- Eastman
- Hatley
- Ogden
- Saint-Benoît-du-Lac
- Saint-Étienne-de-Bolton
- Sainte-Catherine-de-Hatley

Townships (4)

- Hatley
- Orford
- Potton
- Stanstead

Villages (3)

- Ayer's Cliff
- North Hatley
- Stukely-Sud

== Demographics ==
=== Population ===
Canada census – Memphrémagog community profile

	2021	2016	2011
Population	54,797 (+8.7% from 2016)	50,415 (+3.8% from 2011)	48,551 (+7.2% from 2006)
Land area	1,317.42 km^{2} (508.66 sq mi)	1,319.29 km^{2} (509.38 sq mi)	1,320.96 km^{2} (510.03 sq mi)
Population density	41.6/km^{2} (108/sq mi)	38.2/km^{2} (99/sq mi)	36.8/km^{2} (95/sq mi)
Median age	54.4 (M: 53.6, F: 55.2)	51.6 (M: 50.9, F: 52.1)	48.8 (M: 48.4, F: 49.3)
Private dwellings	31,920 (total) 25,600 (occupied)	30,430 (total)	28,760 (total)
Median household income	$71,500	$58,045	$49,541

References: 2021 2016 2011

Historical Census Data - Memphrémagog Regional County Municipality, Quebec

Year	Pop.	±%
1991	35,984	—
1996	38,461	+6.9%
1996A	39,127	+1.7%
2001	41,871	+7.0%

Year	Pop.	±%
2001A	42,267	+0.9%
2006	45,310	+7.2%
2011	48,551	+7.2%
2016	50,415	+3.8%

(A) adjusted figures due to boundary changes.

=== Language ===
Canada Census Mother Tongue - Memphrémagog Regional County Municipality, Quebec
Census	Total	French			English			French & English			Other		
Year	Responses	Count	Trend	Pop %	Count	Trend	Pop %	Count	Trend	Pop %	Count	Trend	Pop %
2021	54,300	45,080	▲9%	83.03%	6,870	▲2.9%	12.65%	1,065	▲86.8%	1.96%	1,080	▲18.02%	1.98%
2016	49,585	41,325	▲4.73	83.34%	6,675	▼6.7%	13.46%	570	▼2.5%	1.1%	915	▲22.8%	1.84%
2011	47,940	39,455	▲10.7%	82.30%	7,155	▼8.1%	14.92%	585	▲80.0%	1.22%	745	▼24.7%	1.55%
2006	44,745	35,645	▲10.6%	79.66%	7,785	▼1.0%	17.40%	325	▼31.6%	0.73%	990	▲53.5%	2.21%
2001	41,195	32,215	▲10.4%	78.20%	7,860	▲1.9%	19.08%	475	▲5.5%	1.15%	645	▲31.6%	1.57%
1996	37,830	29,175	n/a	77.12%	7,715	n/a	20.39%	450	n/a	1.19%	490	n/a	1.30%

== Transportation ==
=== Access Routes ===
Highways and numbered routes that run through the municipality, including external routes that start or finish at the county border:

- Autoroutes
  - A-10
  - A-55
- Principal Highways
  - R-108
  - R-112
  - R-141
  - R-143
- Secondary Highways
  - R-208
  - R-216
  - R-220
  - R-243
  - R-245
  - R-247
- External Routes
  - I-91
  - US 5
  - VT 243

== See also ==
- List of regional county municipalities and equivalent territories in Quebec
- Lake Memphremagog
