= Mount Pinacle =

Hill in Quebec, Canada

- Le Pinacle
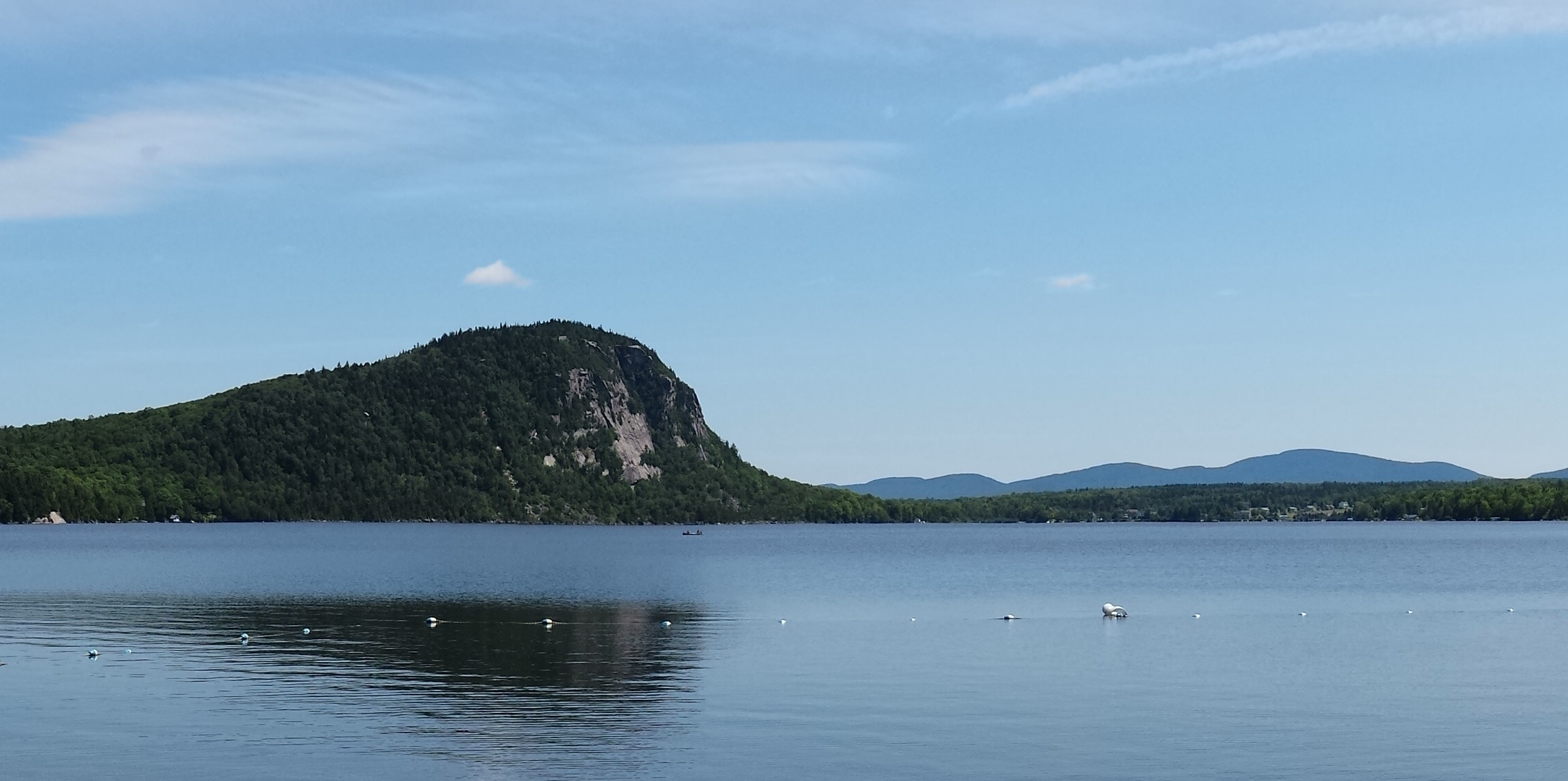
- View of the Mount Pinacle, Baldwin Mill's

Highest point
- Elevation: 665 m (2,182 ft)
- Prominence: 120 m (390 ft)
- Isolation: 2.49 km (1.55 mi)
- Coordinates: 45°01′25″N 71°53′49″W

Geography
- Location within Southern Quebec
- Location: Quebec, Canada
- Parent range: Northern Appalachians
- Topo map: NTS 21E4 Coaticook

Climbing
- Easiest route: hiking, rock climbing

Mount Pinacle (French: Le Pinacle) is a mountain located in Coaticook, Quebec Canada. The mountain has five hiking trails of varying difficulty, covering approximately 7 kilometres (4.3 mi), that visitors can explore with the purchase of an admission ticket. Experienced rock climbers may scale the face of the hill starting from Lake Lyster. The mountain is exploited for its abundance of maples, with a sugar bush running along a portion of its trails.

== History ==
The hill has been officially known as Le Pinacle since 1978.

In 2013, part of the hill was closed to rock climbing due to the nesting of peregrine falcons on Mount Pinacle.

In June 2014, a 10-year-old child on a field trip went to the emergency department after surviving a 10-metre fall down a crevice on the mountain. Approximately a dozen firefighters were onsite for two hours rescuing the child, although he was not gravely injured.

== Activities ==
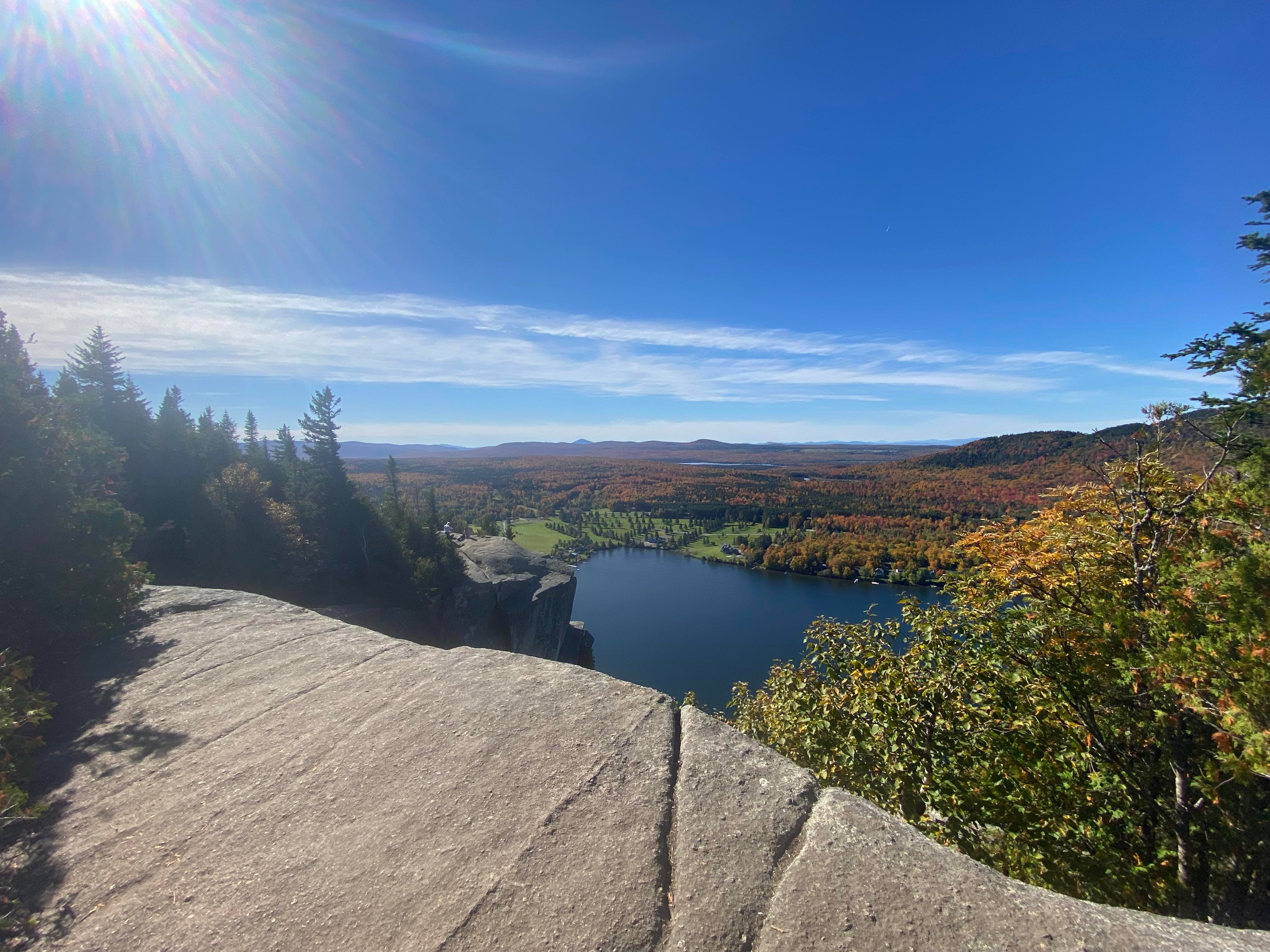
View from the Mount Pinnacle summit in autumn

Mount Pinnacle is home to Harold F. Baldwin Park. There are 7.8 kilometres (4.8 mi) of trails in total, with bottom-to-top trails ranging from 3 to 4 kilometres (2.5 mi).

During the summer season (June to October), guides are on hand at the top of the hill.

Starting December 19, 2022, Mount Pinnacle opened its hiking trails to the public in winter.

On a clear day, you can see Mount Barnston, Mount Orford, Owl's Head, Mount Sutton, Mount Brome, Bald Mountain (Vermont), as well as Lake Massawippi and Holland Pond in Vermont.
