= Willis Keith Baldwin =

Canadian politician (1857–1935)

Member of the Canadian Parliament for Stanstead
- In office 1917–1930
- Preceded by: Charles Henry Lovell
- Succeeded by: John Thomas Hackett

Personal details
- Born: March 17, 1857 Baldwin's Mills, Canada East
- Died: April 19, 1935 (aged 78)
- Party: Liberal

Willis Keith Baldwin (March 17, 1857 – April 19, 1935) was a Canadian politician and lumber merchant. He was elected to the House of Commons of Canada as a Member of the Laurier Liberals to represent the riding of Stanstead. He was re-elected as a Liberal in 1921 and again in 1925 and 1926.

== Electoral record ==
1911 Canadian federal election: Stanstead
Party	Candidate	Votes
Liberal	Charles Henry Lovell	2,310
Conservative	George Waldo Paige	2,106

1917 Canadian federal election: Stanstead
Party	Candidate	Votes
Opposition (Laurier Liberals)	Willis Keith Baldwin	3,047
Government (Unionist)	William Lewis Shurtleff	2,346

1921 Canadian federal election: Stanstead
Party	Candidate	Votes
Liberal	Willis Keith Baldwin	6,877
Conservative	Porter Lloyd Baldwin	3,104

1925 Canadian federal election: Stanstead
Party	Candidate	Votes
Liberal	Willis Keith Baldwin	5,520
Conservative	John Thomas Hackett	4,326

1926 Canadian federal election: Stanstead
Party	Candidate	Votes
Liberal	Willis Keith Baldwin	5,135
Conservative	George Garfield Fish	3,740
