= Henry Lovell =

Canadian politician

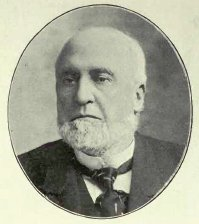

Member of the Canadian Parliament for Stanstead
- In office 1900–1907
- Preceded by: Alvin Head Moore
- Succeeded by: Charles Henry Lovell

Member of the Legislative Assembly of Quebec for Stanstead
- In office 1878–1881
- Preceded by: John Thornton
- Succeeded by: John Thornton

Personal details
- Born: June 13, 1828 Barnston, Lower Canada
- Died: December 4, 1907 (aged 79) Coaticook, Quebec, Canada
- Party: Liberal Party of Canada
- Other political affiliations: Quebec Liberal Party
- Children: Charles Henry Lovell; Moodie Brock Lovell

Henry Lovell (June 13, 1828 – December 4, 1907) was a Canadian politician. Born in Barnston, Stanstead County, Lower Canada, the son of William Lovell and Mary Hanson, Lovell was a farmer and merchant. He moved to Coaticook, Quebec in 1867. He was a municipal councillor in Coaticook from 1876 to 1885 and again from 1888 to 1891. He was mayor from 1874 to 1875 and from 1886 to 1887. He was elected to the Legislative Assembly of Quebec in 1878 for the riding of Stanstead. A Quebec Liberal, he was defeated in 1881 and 1886. He was elected to the House of Commons of Canada for Stanstead in 1900. A Liberal, he was re-elected in 1904. He died while in office in 1907. His son, Charles Henry Lovell, was elected in the 1908 by-election following the death of his father. His other son, Moodie Brock Lovell, was a Member of the Legislative Assembly of Quebec.

== Electoral record ==
1900 Canadian federal election: Stanstead
Party	Candidate	Votes
Liberal	Henry Lovell	1,783
Conservative	Alvin Head Moore	1,618

1904 Canadian federal election: Stanstead
Party	Candidate	Votes
Liberal	Henry Lovell	1,966
Conservative	Michael Felix Hackett	1,693
