= Moodie Brock Lovell =

Canadian politician

Member of Legislative Assembly of Quebec for Stanstead
- In office 1890–1892
- Preceded by: Ozro Baldwin
- Succeeded by: Michael Felix Hackett
- In office 1900–1902
- Preceded by: Michael Felix Hackett
- Succeeded by: Georges-Henri Saint-Pierre

Personal details
- Born: April 11, 1853 Barnston, Canada East
- Died: January 29, 1902 (aged 48) Portland, Maine, U.S.
- Party: Liberal
- Relations: Henry Lovell, father Charles Henry Lovell, brother

Moodie Brock Lovell (April 11, 1853 – January 29, 1902) was a lumber merchant and political figure in Quebec. He represented Stanstead in the Legislative Assembly of Quebec from 1890 to 1892 and from 1900 to 1904 as a Liberal.

He was born in Barnston, Canada East, the son of Henry Lovell and Artemissa Merriman, and was educated in Coaticook. He entered the lumber business with his father in the company H. Lovell and Sons. Lovell was also involved in the operation of the Grand Valley Lumber Company, also owned by his father. In 1878, he married Charlotte Elizabeth Pierce. Lovell did not run for reelection in 1892 and was defeated in 1897. He was president of the agricultural society for the Eastern Townships. He died in office in Portland, Maine at the age of 48 and was buried in Coaticook.

His brother Charles Henry served in the House of Commons of Canada.
