= Louis-Édouard Roberge =

Canadian politician

Member of Parliament for Stanstead
- In office 27 June 1949 – 30 March 1958
- Preceded by: John Thomas Hackett
- Succeeded by: René Létourneau

Personal details
- Born: 11 September 1896 Plessisville, Quebec, Canada
- Died: 1 July 1982 (aged 85) Sherbrooke, Quebec, Canada
- Party: Liberal
- Profession: Merchant

Louis-Édouard Roberge (11 September 1896 – 1 July 1982) was a Liberal party member of the House of Commons of Canada. He was born in Plessisville, Quebec and became a merchant by career.

He was first elected at the Stanstead riding in the 1949 general election then re-elected in 1953 and 1957. Roberge was defeated by René Létourneau of the Progressive Conservative party in the 1958 election.

== Electoral record ==
1949 Canadian federal election: Stanstead
Party	Candidate	Votes
Liberal	Louis-Édouard Roberge	7,736
Progressive Conservative	John Thomas Hackett	7,251
Union des électeurs	Armand-Germain Bégin	1,358
Liberal–Labour	Joseph-Ernest Simard	433

1953 Canadian federal election: Stanstead
Party	Candidate	Votes
Liberal	Louis-Édouard Roberge	10,034
Progressive Conservative	Calixte Chamberland	6,736

1957 Canadian federal election: Stanstead
Party	Candidate	Votes
Liberal	Louis-Édouard Roberge	9,827
Progressive Conservative	René Létourneau	7,424

1958 Canadian federal election: Stanstead
Party	Candidate	Votes
Progressive Conservative	René Létourneau	10,363
Liberal	Louis-Édouard Roberge	7,638
Independent	Maurice Théroux	489
