= Ovila Bergeron =

Canadian politician

Ovila Bergeron was a politician and business person in Quebec, Canada.

== Background ==
He was born on February 17, 1903, in Warwick, Quebec.

== Political career ==
Lemieux ran as a Bloc Populaire Canadien candidate in the provincial district of Stanstead in the 1944 election and won against incumbent Raymond-François Frégeau. He served as his party House Whip from 1945 to 1948. He did not run for re-election in the 1948 election. He was mayor of Magog between 1952 and 1956 and, in interim, to June 22, 1966, at November 6, 1967.

== Death ==
He died on December 3, 1985.

== Footnotes ==
National Assembly of Quebec
Preceded by Raymond-François Frégeau (Liberal & Independent)	MLA for Stanstead; 1944–1948	Succeeded by Léon-Denis Gérin (Union Nationale)
