= Thomas Locke =

Canadian politician

Member of the Legislative Assembly of Quebec for Stanstead
- In office 1867–1875
- Succeeded by: John Thornton

Personal details
- Born: June 16, 1824 Barnston, Lower Canada
- Died: January 27, 1884 (aged 59) Barnston, Quebec
- Party: Conservative

Thomas Locke (June 16, 1824 – January 27, 1884) was a farmer and political figure. He represented Stanstead in the Legislative Assembly of Quebec from 1867 to 1875 as a Conservative.

He was born in Barnston, Lower Canada, the son of Levi Locke and Sally Clement, both natives of New Hampshire. Locke was a captain in the militia and was mayor of Barnston in 1864 and 1865. He also served as school commissioner and justice of the peace. In 1846, he married Lydia E. Howard. Locke was defeated when he ran for reelection in 1875. He died in Barnston at the age of 59.
