= Barnston Mount =

Mountain in Canada

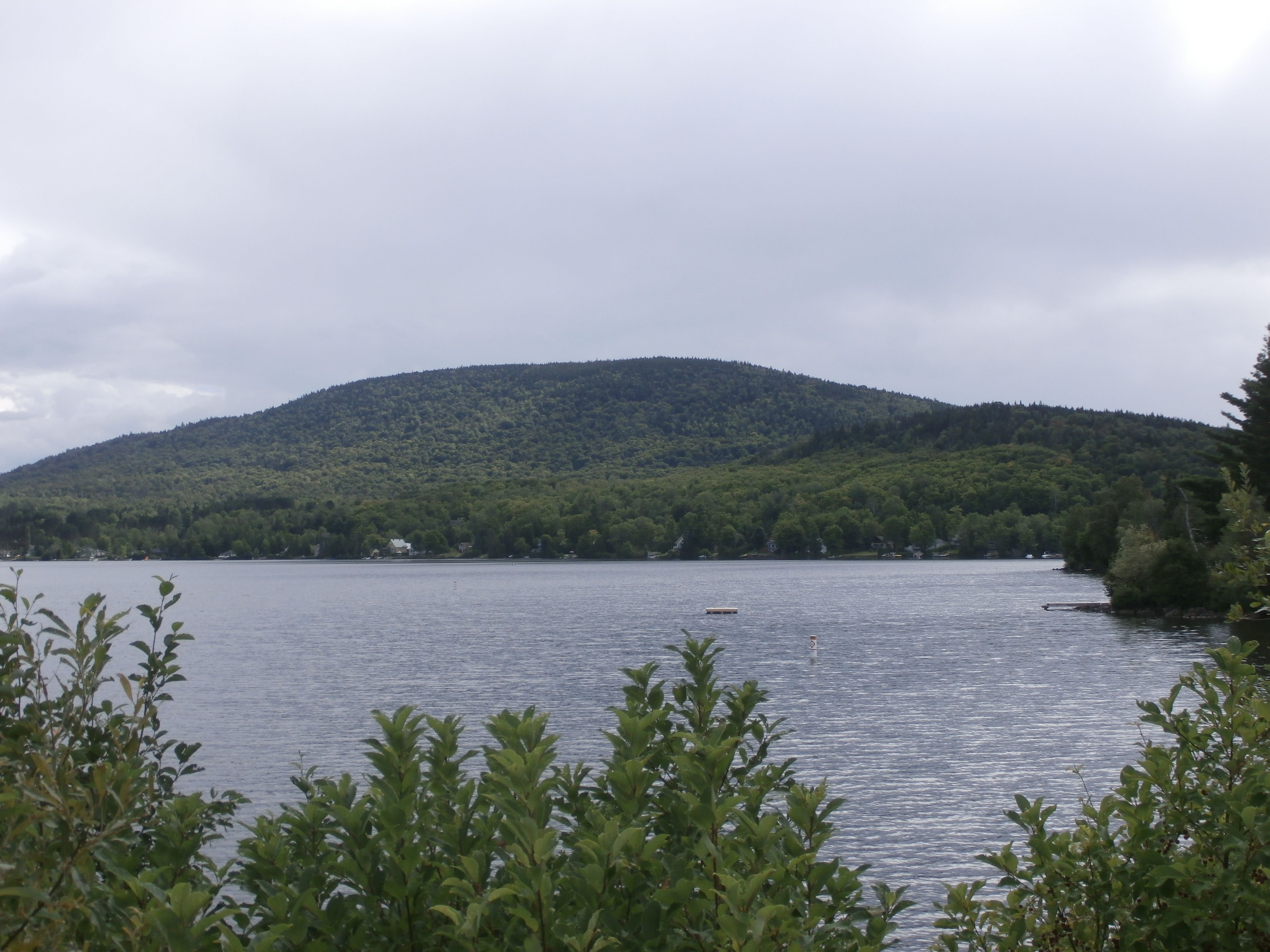
- View of Mount Barnston west of Lyster Lake.

Highest point
- Peak: 743

Geography
- Location: Coaticook
- Country: Canada
- State: Quebec
- Region: Estrie
- District: Coaticook Regional County Municipality

Mount Barnston is a mountain located at Coaticook, in the regional county municipality of Coaticook, in the administrative region of Estrie, in Quebec (Canada), just north of the American border with Vermont. Its altitude is 743 meters

== Geography ==
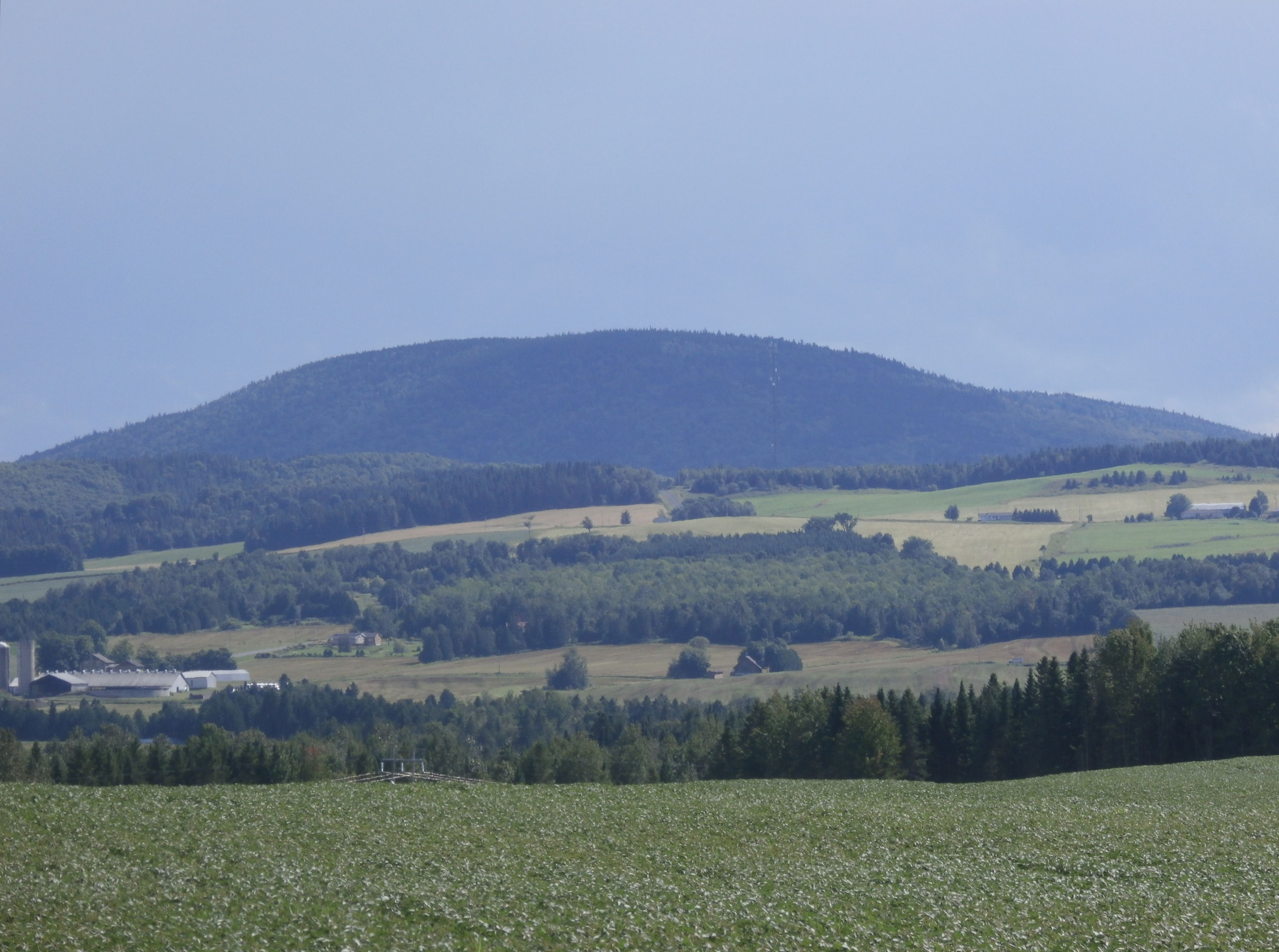
Agricultural landscape north of Mount Barnston.

The mountain is located near Lyster Lake and the hamlet of Baldwin Mills in the agricultural valley of the Coaticook River.
