= Ozro Baldwin =

Canadian politician (1836–1911)

Member of the Legislative Assembly of Quebec for Stanstead
- In office 1886–1890
- Preceded by: John Thornton
- Succeeded by: Moodie Brock Lovell

Personal details
- Born: c. 1836 Barnston, Lower Canada
- Died: July 19, 1911 Coaticook, Quebec
- Party: Conservative
- Occupation: lumber merchant and political figure

Ozro Baldwin (c. 1836 – July 19, 1911) was a lumber merchant and political figure in Quebec. He represented Stanstead in the Legislative Assembly of Quebec from 1886 to 1890 as a Conservative.

He was born in Barnston, Lower Canada, the son of Ira Baldwin and Susan Glover, and established himself at Dixville. In 1858, he married Nancy Piper. Baldwin served as mayor of Dixville from 1873 to 1878 and of Barford from 1885 to 1893. He died at Coaticook and was buried in Dixville.
