= John Thornton (Canadian politician) =

Canadian politician in Quebec (1823–1888)

Member of the Legislative Assembly of Quebec for Stanstead
- In office 1875–1878
- Preceded by: Thomas Locke
- Succeeded by: Henry Lovell
- In office 1881–1886
- Preceded by: Henry Lovell
- Succeeded by: Ozro Baldwin

Personal details
- Born: April 3, 1823 Derby, Vermont
- Died: February 17, 1888 (aged 64) Coaticook, Quebec
- Party: Conservative
- Spouse: Lucy Baldwin

John Thornton (April 3, 1823 – February 17, 1888) was an American-born merchant, farmer and political figure in Quebec. He represented Stanstead in the Legislative Assembly of Quebec from 1875 to 1878 and from 1881 to 1886 as a Conservative.

He was born in Derby, Vermont, the son of John L. Thornton and Dolly Bagley, and was educated there and at Stanstead College. He came to Lower Canada in 1841 and set up business at Barnston, later moving to Coaticook. Thornton sold equipment used in the construction of the railway between Richmond and Stanhope. In 1847, he married Lucy Baldwin. He served on the council for Barnston township, was mayor of Coaticook in 1872 and 1873 and was warden for Stanstead County from 1872 to 1874. He was defeated by Henry Lovell when he ran for reelection in 1878. Thornton died at Coaticook at the age of 64.
