= Robert Davidson (Canadian politician) =

Canadian politician

Member of Parliament for Stanstead
- In office 14 October 1935 – 24 May 1943
- Preceded by: John Thomas Hackett
- Succeeded by: Joseph-Armand Choquette

Personal details
- Born: Robert Greig Davidson; 21 July 1875 Sherbrooke, Quebec, Canada
- Died: 3 August 1948 (aged 73)
- Party: Liberal
- Spouse(s): Anna Smillie m. 18 October 1899
- Profession: farmer

Robert Greig Davidson (21 July 1875 – 3 August 1948) was a Liberal party member of the House of Commons of Canada. He was born in Sherbrooke, Quebec and became a farmer.

Davidson attended high school in Sherbrooke and then St. Charles Borromeo College in Charlesbourg. He became a trustee of Stanstead Wesleyan College and director of the Western Townships Agricultural Association.

He was first elected to Parliament at the Stanstead riding in the 1935 general election.

He was re-elected for a second term in 1940. The Supreme Court, on appeal, annulled the election, because of corrupt practices arising from the buying of votes with whisky and money. That ruling was also the first time the Supreme Court had set aside a lower court decision with respect to an election verdict. The matter had to be referred to the House Privileges and Elections Committee for a recommendation as to how to proceed. The committee would not report until May 1943, clearing the way for the byelection to be held.

Davidson attempted to return to office in the byelection held August 9, 1943, but was defeated by the Bloc Populaire candidate Joseph-Armand Choquette.

== Electoral record ==
1935 Canadian federal election: Stanstead
Party	Candidate	Votes
Liberal	Robert Davison	5,676
Conservative	John Thomas Hackett	5,553
Reconstruction	James Bert Reed	434

1940 Canadian federal election: Stanstead
Party	Candidate	Votes
Liberal	Robert Davison	5,112
Independent Liberal	Alphonse Girard	4,804

By-election on 9 August 1943 Election was declared void, 24 May 1943
Party	Candidate	Votes
Bloc populaire	Joseph-Armand Choquette	6,661
Liberal	Robert Davison	5,349
Co-operative Commonwealth	Pierre Albandia Thomas	257
