= Alvin Head Moore =

Canadian politician

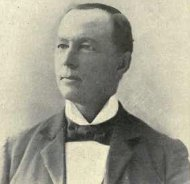

Member of the Canadian Parliament for Stanstead
- In office 1896–1900
- Preceded by: Timothy Byron Rider
- Succeeded by: Henry Lovell

Personal details
- Born: April 20, 1838 Hatley, Lower Canada
- Died: February 20, 1911 (aged 72)
- Party: Conservative

Alvin Head Moore (April 20, 1838 – February 20, 1911) was a Canadian politician.

Born in Hatley, Stanstead County, Lower Canada, the son of American born United Empire Loyalists, Moore was president of the Waterloo and Magog Railway. He was Mayor of the Township and Town of Magog and Warden of the County of Stanstead. He was elected to the House of Commons of Canada for the Quebec electoral district of Stanstead in the general elections of 1896. A Conservative, he was defeated in 1900 and 1908.

== Electoral record ==
1896 Canadian federal election: Stanstead
Party	Candidate	Votes
Conservative	Alvin Head Moore	2,018
Liberal	Timothy Byron Rider	1,583

1900 Canadian federal election: Stanstead
Party	Candidate	Votes
Liberal	Henry Lovell	1,783
Conservative	Alvin Head Moore	1,618
