= Stanstead (federal electoral district) =

Former federal electoral district in Quebec, Canada

Quebec electoral district

Defunct federal electoral district
- Legislature: House of Commons
- District created: 1867
- District abolished: 1966
- First contested: 1867
- Last contested: 1965

Stanstead was a federal electoral district in Quebec, Canada, that was represented in the House of Commons of Canada from 1867 to 1968.

It was created by the British North America Act, 1867. It consisted initially of the Townships of Stanstead, Barnston, Hatley, Barford, and Magog East and West.

In 1924, it was redefined to exclude the part of the municipality of St. Herménégilde lying in the township of Hereford.

In 1947, it was redefined to consist of:

- the county of Stanstead, (except the municipality and the village of St. Herménégilde), and the towns of Coaticook and Magog;
- the town of Lennoxville and the south-eastern parts of the county of Sherbrooke, and the municipality of Compton and the villages of Compton and Waterville.

The electoral district was abolished in 1966 when it was redistributed into Compton, Missisquoi, Shefford and Sherbrooke ridings.

== Members of Parliament ==
This riding elected the following members of Parliament:

Parliament	Years	Member	Party
Stanstead
1st	1867–1872	Charles Carroll Colby	Liberal–Conservative
2nd	1872–1874	Charles Carroll Colby	Liberal–Conservative
3rd	1874–1878	Charles Carroll Colby	Liberal–Conservative
4th	1878–1882	Charles Carroll Colby	Liberal–Conservative
5th	1882–1887	Charles Carroll Colby	Liberal–Conservative
6th	1887–1889	Charles Carroll Colby	Liberal–Conservative
6th	1889–1891	Charles Carroll Colby	Liberal–Conservative
7th	1891–1896	Timothy Byron Rider	Liberal
8th	1896–1900	Alvin Head Moore	Conservative
9th	1900–1904	Henry Lovell	Liberal
10th	1904–1907	Henry Lovell	Liberal
10th	1908–1908	Charles Henry Lovell	Liberal
11th	1908–1911	Charles Henry Lovell	Liberal
12th	1911–1917	Charles Henry Lovell	Liberal
13th	1917–1921	Willis Keith Baldwin	Opposition (Laurier Liberals)
14th	1921–1925	Willis Keith Baldwin	Liberal
15th	1925–1926	Willis Keith Baldwin	Liberal
16th	1926–1930	Willis Keith Baldwin	Liberal
17th	1930–1935	John Thomas Hackett	Conservative
18th	1935–1940	Robert Davidson	Liberal
19th	1940–1943	Robert Davidson	Liberal
19th	1943–1945	Joseph-Armand Choquette	Bloc populaire
20th	1945–1949	John Thomas Hackett	Progressive Conservative
21st	1949–1953	Louis-Édouard Roberge	Liberal
22nd	1953–1957	Louis-Édouard Roberge	Liberal
23rd	1957–1958	Louis-Édouard Roberge	Liberal
24th	1958–1962	René Létourneau	Progressive Conservative
25th	1962–1963	René Létourneau	Progressive Conservative
26th	1963–1965	Yves Forest	Liberal
27th	1965–1968	Yves Forest	Liberal
Riding dissolved into Compton, Missisquoi, Shefford and Sherbrooke

== Election results ==
1867 Canadian federal election
Party	Candidate	Votes
Liberal–Conservative	Charles Carroll Colby	814
Unknown	Albert Knight	616
Source: Canadian Elections Database

1872 Canadian federal election
Party	Candidate	Votes
Liberal–Conservative	Charles Carroll Colby	acclaimed
Source: Canadian Elections Database

1874 Canadian federal election
Party	Candidate	Votes
Liberal–Conservative	Charles Carroll Colby	acclaimed
Source: lop.parl.ca

1878 Canadian federal election
Party	Candidate	Votes
Liberal–Conservative	Charles Carroll Colby	1,492
Unknown	E.R. Johnson	738

1882 Canadian federal election
Party	Candidate	Votes
Liberal–Conservative	Charles Carroll Colby	1,308
Unknown	H.M. Rider	1,013

1887 Canadian federal election
Party	Candidate	Votes
Liberal–Conservative	Charles Carroll Colby	1,844
Liberal	H.M. Rider	1,410

By-election on 18 December 1889 On Colby being appointed President of the Privy Council, 28 November 1889
Party	Candidate	Votes
Liberal–Conservative	Charles Carroll Colby	acclaimed

1891 Canadian federal election
Party	Candidate	Votes
Liberal	Timothy Byron Rider	1,655
Liberal–Conservative	Charles Carroll Colby	1,553

1896 Canadian federal election
Party	Candidate	Votes
Conservative	Alvin Head Moore	2,018
Liberal	Timothy Byron Rider	1,583

1900 Canadian federal election
Party	Candidate	Votes
Liberal	Henry Lovell	1,783
Conservative	Alvin Head Moore	1,618

1904 Canadian federal election
Party	Candidate	Votes
Liberal	Henry Lovell	1,966
Conservative	Michael Felix Hackett	1,693

By-election on 22 January 1908 On Lovell's death, 4 December 1907
Party	Candidate	Votes
Liberal	Charles Henry Lovell	2,189
Conservative	A.H. Moore	1,916

1908 Canadian federal election
Party	Candidate	Votes
Liberal	Charles Henry Lovell	2,211
Conservative	George Waldo Paige	2,048

1911 Canadian federal election
Party	Candidate	Votes
Liberal	Charles Henry Lovell	2,310
Conservative	George Waldo Paige	2,106

1917 Canadian federal election
Party	Candidate	Votes
Opposition (Laurier Liberals)	Willis Keith Baldwin	3,047
Government (Unionist)	William Lewis Shurtleff	2,346

1921 Canadian federal election
Party	Candidate	Votes
Liberal	Willis Keith Baldwin	6,877
Conservative	Porter Lloyd Baldwin	3,104

1925 Canadian federal election
Party	Candidate	Votes
Liberal	Willis Keith Baldwin	5,520
Conservative	John Thomas Hackett	4,326

1926 Canadian federal election
Party	Candidate	Votes
Liberal	Willis Keith Baldwin	5,135
Conservative	George Garfield Fish	3,740

1930 Canadian federal election
Party	Candidate	Votes
Conservative	John Thomas Hackett	5,804
Liberal	Cecil Lorne Brown	3,900
Independent Liberal	Jean-Charles Samson	1,584

1935 Canadian federal election
Party	Candidate	Votes
Liberal	Robert Davison	5,676
Conservative	John Thomas Hackett	5,553
Reconstruction	James Bert Reed	434

1940 Canadian federal election
Party	Candidate	Votes
Liberal	Robert Davison	5,112
Independent Liberal	Alphonse Girard	4,804

By-election on 9 August 1943 Election was declared void, 24 May 1943
Party	Candidate	Votes
Bloc populaire	Joseph-Armand Choquette	6,661
Liberal	Robert Davison	5,349
Co-operative Commonwealth	Pierre Albandia Thomas	257

1945 Canadian federal election
Party	Candidate	Votes
Progressive Conservative	John Thomas Hackett	5,028
Bloc populaire	Joseph-Armand Choquette	4,553
Liberal	Toussaint-Russell Carrière	3,545
Social Credit	Joseph-Clément Bégin	365
Co-operative Commonwealth	John Withall	169

1949 Canadian federal election
Party	Candidate	Votes
Liberal	Louis-Édouard Roberge	7,736
Progressive Conservative	John Thomas Hackett	7,251
Union des électeurs	Armand-Germain Bégin	1,358
Liberal–Labour	Joseph-Ernest Simard	433

1953 Canadian federal election
Party	Candidate	Votes
Liberal	Louis-Édouard Roberge	10,034
Progressive Conservative	Calixte Chamberland	6,736

1957 Canadian federal election
Party	Candidate	Votes
Liberal	Louis-Édouard Roberge	9,827
Progressive Conservative	René Létourneau	7,424

1958 Canadian federal election
Party	Candidate	Votes
Progressive Conservative	René Létourneau	10,363
Liberal	Louis-Édouard Roberge	7,638
Independent	Maurice Théroux	489

1962 Canadian federal election
Party	Candidate	Votes
Progressive Conservative	René Létourneau	7,982
Social Credit	Roméo Custeau	6,448
Liberal	Bertrand Brassard	4,944

1963 Canadian federal election
Party	Candidate	Votes
Liberal	Yves Forest	7,649
Progressive Conservative	René Létourneau	6,394
Social Credit	Roméo Custeau	4,714

1965 Canadian federal election
Party	Candidate	Votes
Liberal	Yves Forest	7,626
Progressive Conservative	René Létourneau	6,495
Ralliement créditiste	Henri Brousseau	2,854
New Democratic	Fernand Comptois	1,157

== See also ==
- List of Canadian electoral districts
- Historical federal electoral districts of Canada
