= Charles Henry Lovell =

Canadian politician

Charles Henry Lovell (November 12, 1854 – October 17, 1916) was a farmer, lumber merchant and political figure in Quebec, Canada. He represented Stanstead in the House of Commons of Canada from 1908 to 1916 as a Liberal.

He was born in Barnston, Canada East, the son of Henry Lovell and Artemissa Merriman, and was educated at the Coaticook Academy. Lovell went into business with his brothers Moodie Brock and Fritz Ernest. He married Ada Bush. Lovell was elected to the House of Commons in a 1908 by-election held following the death of his father. He died in office at his home in Coaticook, Quebec, Canada, at the age of 61.

== Electoral record ==
1904 Canadian federal election: Stanstead
Party	Candidate	Votes
Liberal	Henry Lovell	1,966
Conservative	Michael Felix Hackett	1,693

By-election on 22 January 1908 On Lovell's death, 4 December 1907
Party	Candidate	Votes
Liberal	Charles Henry Lovell	2,189
Conservative	A.H. Moore	1,916

1904 Canadian federal election: Stanstead
Party	Candidate	Votes
Liberal	Henry Lovell	1,966
Conservative	Michael Felix Hackett	1,693

1908 Canadian federal election: Stanstead
Party	Candidate	Votes
Liberal	Charles Henry Lovell	2,211
Conservative	George Waldo Paige	2,048

1911 Canadian federal election: Stanstead
Party	Candidate	Votes
Liberal	Charles Henry Lovell	2,310
Conservative	George Waldo Paige	2,106
