= Joseph-Armand Choquette =

Canadian politician (1905–1999)

Joseph-Armand Choquette (July 24, 1905 – April 6, 1999) was a farmer and politician. He was the first Member of Parliament to have been elected to the House of Commons of Canada representing the Bloc populaire canadien and was also the last surviving member of the Bloc populaire's caucus when he died in 1999 at the age of 93.

== Biography ==
Choquette entered parliament via an August 9, 1943 by-election in Stanstead in the Eastern Townships of Quebec which he stood in the midst of the Conscription Crisis for the anti-draft party. He defeated former MP Robert Davison of the governing Liberal Party of Canada by more than 1200 votes. The by-election had been called as a result of Davidson's victory in the 1940 election victory being overturned by the courts due to voting irregularities. While Davidson won most of the English vote in the by-election, Choquette cornered the francophone vote with the support of the president of the Catholic Farmers Union and of legendary Quebec politician Henri Bourassa who campaigned on his behalf.

He sat in the House of Commons for two years before being defeated in the 1945 federal election by Progressive Conservative John Thomas Hackett by less than 500 votes.

Outside of his brief parliamentary career, Choquette served as secretary-treasurer of the municipality of Sainte-Catherine-de-Hatley, Quebec for 32 years and operated a farm in the municipality. He was also Diocesan President of the Catholic Farmers Union for several years.

== Electoral record ==
By-election on 9 August 1943 Election was declared void, 24 May 1943
Party	Candidate	Votes
Bloc populaire	Joseph-Armand Choquette	6,661
Liberal	Robert Greig Davidson	5,349
Co-operative Commonwealth	Pierre Albandia Thomas	257

1945 Canadian federal election: Stanstead
Party	Candidate	Votes
Progressive Conservative	John Thomas Hackett	5,028
Bloc populaire	Joseph-Armand Choquette	4,553
Liberal	Toussaint-Russell Carrière	3,545
Social Credit	Joseph-Clément Bégin	365
Co-operative Commonwealth	John Withall	169
