= Stanstead (provincial electoral district) =

Coordinates: 45.11°N 72.20°W

Quebec electoral district

Defunct provincial electoral district
- Legislature: National Assembly of Quebec
- District created: 1867
- District abolished: 1972
- First contested: 1867
- Last contested: 1970

Stanstead was a provincial electoral district in the Estrie region of Quebec, Canada.

It was created for the 1867 election (and an electoral district of that name existed earlier in the Legislative Assembly of the Province of Canada and the Legislative Assembly of Lower Canada). Its final election was in 1970. It disappeared in the 1973 election, and its successor electoral district was Orford.

== Members of the Legislative Assembly / National Assembly ==
- Thomas Locke, Conservative Party (1867–1875)
- John Thornton, Conservative Party (1875–1878)
- Henry Lovell, Liberal (1878–1881)
- John Thornton, Conservative Party (1881–1886)
- Ozro Baldwin, Conservative Party (1886–1890)
- Moodie Brock Lovell, Liberal (1890–1892)
- Michael Felix Hackett, Conservative Party (1892–1900)
- Moodie Brock Lovell, Liberal (1900–1902)
- Georges-Henri Saint-Pierre, Conservative Party (1902–1904)
- Prosper-Alfred Bissonnet, Liberal (1904–1913)
- Alfred-Joseph Bisonnet, Liberal (1913–1935)
- Rouville Beaudry, Action liberale nationale – Union Nationale (1935–1938)
- Henri Gérin, Union Nationale (1938–1939)
- Raymond-François Frégeau, Liberal (1939–1944)
- Ovila Bergeron, Bloc populaire canadien (1944–1948)
- Léon-Denis Gérin, Union Nationale (1948–1960)
- Georges Vaillancourt, Liberal (1960–1973) (re-elected in Orford in 1973)
