= Léon-Denis Gérin =

Canadian politician (1894–1975)

Member of the Legislative Assembly of Quebec for Stanstead
- In office 1948–1960
- Preceded by: Raymond-François Frégeau
- Succeeded by: Georges Vaillancourt

Personal details
- Born: June 6, 1894 Sainte-Edwige-de-Clifton, Quebec
- Died: April 1, 1975 (aged 80) Coaticook, Quebec
- Party: Union Nationale

Léon-Denis Gérin (June 6, 1894 – April 1, 1975) was a politician Quebec, Canada and a three-term Member of the Legislative Assembly of Quebec (MLA).

== Early life ==
He was born on June 6, 1894, in Sainte-Edwidge-de-Clifton, Eastern Townships.

== City politics ==
Gérin served as a city councillor from 1934 to 1935 and from 1942 to 1943 and as Mayor from 1944 to 1945 in Coaticook, Quebec.

== Member of the legislature ==
He ran as a Union Nationale candidate in the provincial district of Stanstead in the 1948 provincial election and won. He was re-elected in the 1952 and 1956 elections.

Gérin was defeated in the 1960 election against Liberal candidate Georges Vaillancourt.

== Death ==
He died on April 1, 1975.
