= Michael Felix Hackett =

Canadian lawyer, judge, and politician

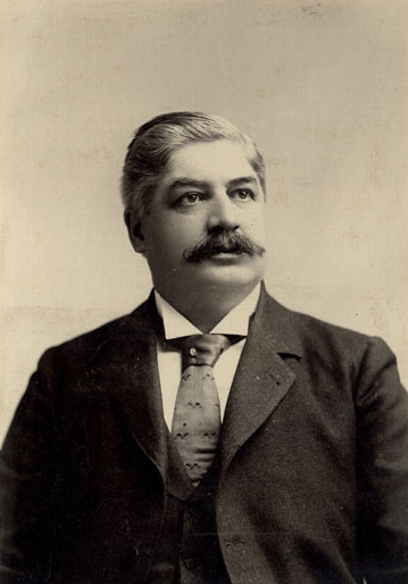

Member of the Legislative Assembly of Quebec for Stanstead
- In office 1892–1900
- Preceded by: Moodie Brock Lovell
- Succeeded by: Moodie Brock Lovell

Personal details
- Born: August 23, 1851 Granby, Canada East
- Died: April 12, 1926 (aged 74) Cowansville, Quebec
- Party: Conservative
- Children: John Thomas Hackett

Michael Felix Hackett (August 23, 1851 – April 12, 1926) was a lawyer, judge and political figure in Quebec. He represented Stanstead in the Legislative Assembly of Quebec from 1892 to 1900 as a Conservative member.

He was born in Granby, Canada East, the son of Patrick Hackett and Mary Griffin, and was educated at the Granby Academy College, Saint-Hyacinthe College and McGill University. Hackett was admitted to the Quebec bar in 1874 and set up practice at Stanstead Plain (later part of Stanstead). In 1883, he married Florence Alberta, the daughter of Albert Knight. Hackett was mayor of Stanstead Plain from 1890 to 1904 and warden for Stanstead County from 1891 to 1897. He also served as captain in the militia and president of the Stanstead County Farmers' Institute. He was president of the province's Executive Council from 1895 to 1896 and provincial secretary from 1896 to 1897. In 1899, he was named Queen's Counsel. Hackett was defeated when he ran for reelection in 1900. He was an unsuccessful candidate for a seat in the federal House of Commons in 1904. In 1915, Hackett was named a judge in the Quebec Superior Court for Bedford district. He died in Cowansville at the age of 76.

His son John Thomas Hackett served in the House of Commons and Senate of Canada.
