= Yves Forest =

Canadian politician (1921–2019)

- Official 1968 portrait

Member of Parliament for Stanstead
- In office April 1963 – June 1968

Member of Parliament for Missisquoi
- In office June 1968 – October 1972

Personal details
- Born: 25 June 1921 Sherbrooke, Quebec, Canada
- Died: 18 July 2019 (aged 98) Magog, Quebec, Canada
- Party: Liberal
- Spouse(s): Elizabeth St-Martin m. 15 August 1947
- Profession: Lawyer

Yves Forest, QC (25 June 1921 – 18 July 2019) was a Liberal party member of the House of Commons of Canada. He was a lawyer by career.

== Biography ==
Born in Sherbrooke, Quebec, Forest attended school at Saint-Charles Seminary in Sherbrooke, then earned a Bachelor of Arts and Bachelor of Laws at Université de Montréal.

He was first elected at the Stanstead riding in the 1963 general election then re-elected there in the 1965 election. In the 1968 election, he was elected to another Parliamentary term at Missisquoi riding. Forest left federal politics when he was defeated in the 1972 federal election at Brome—Missisquoi.

Since January 2004, Forest became a director of the Historical Society of Magog and was honoured for his work in November 2009. He died in July 2019 at the age of 98.

1963 Canadian federal election: Stanstead
| Party | Candidate | Votes |
|---|---|---|
| Liberal | Yves Forest | 7,649 |
| Progressive Conservative | René Létourneau | 6,394 |
| Social Credit | Roméo Custeau | 4,714 |

1965 Canadian federal election: Stanstead
| Party | Candidate | Votes |
|---|---|---|
| Liberal | Yves Forest | 7,626 |
| Progressive Conservative | René Létourneau | 6,495 |
| Ralliement créditiste | Henri Brousseau | 2,854 |
| New Democratic | Fernand Comptois | 1,157 |
