= Coaticook station =

Railway station in Quebec, Canada

Coaticook
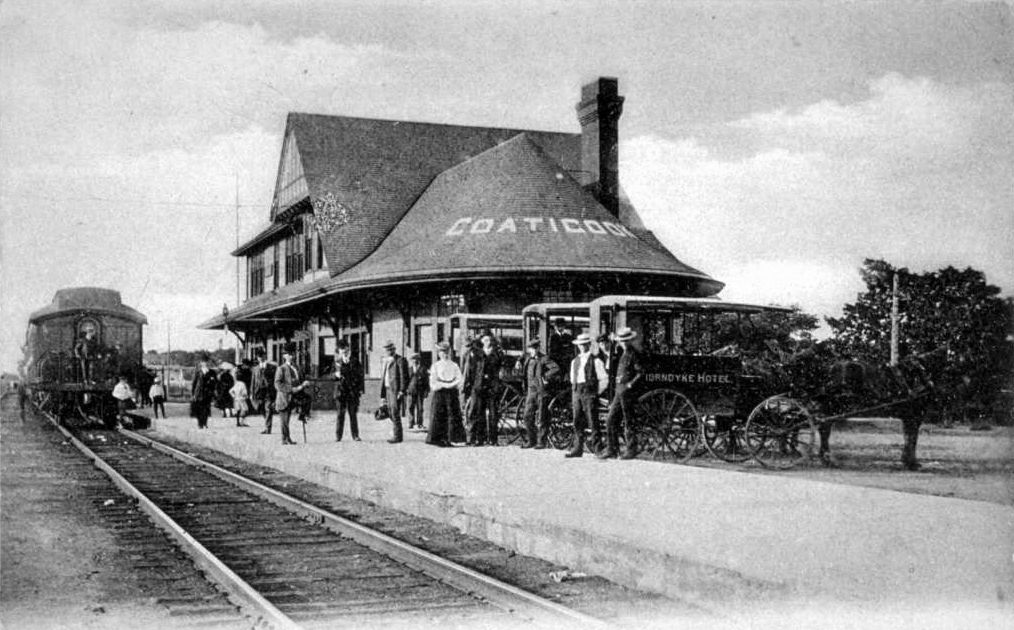
- View of station in 1904

General information
- Location: 131, Rue Lovell; Coaticook, Quebec; Canada.
- Coordinates: 45°07′51″N 71°48′31″W

Other information
- Status: restored

History
- Opened: 1883
- Closed: 1965

Former services
Preceding station	Canadian National Railway	Following station
Hillhurst toward Montreal	Montreal – Portland	Dixville toward Portland

Patrimoine culturel du Québec
- Official name: Vieille gare de Coaticook
- Designated: 1999
- Reference no.: 8246
Route map
Location

Coaticook station is a historic building in the small town of Coaticook, Quebec, Canada, close to the border with the United States. The first station, which was on the west side of the tracks, was completed in 1853 by the St. Lawrence and Atlantic Railroad. The current building was constructed on the east side of the tracks in 1904 by the Grand Trunk Railway. The two storey wooden frame building has a single storey conical roofed southerly end and a small extension on the north end. One of the façades includes a two-story bay window topped by a gable-pediment. The old station is located in a semi-wooded area in a residential area of the town.

== History ==
During the 1840s, the St. Lawrence and Atlantic Railroad, built a railway line. This connected by rail Montreal to the port facilities of Portland in the state of Maine. The residents of the township of Barnston succeeded in convincing the officials of the St. Lawrence and Atlantic Railroad to include Coaticook, which was then only a small hamlet on the route of the railway line. The first passenger train stopped in Coaticook in 1853. The railway, which subsequently changed its name to the Grand Trunk Railroad was completed in 1859. The first station was completed in 1853. It was replaced by a new station in 1904.

The heritage value of the old Coaticook station is based on its architectural interest. It is representative of a new type of station that appeared at the turn of the twentieth century. In the last decade of the nineteenth century, the Grand Trunk Railway made significant changes to the architecture of its stations. These buildings are distinguished by their picturesque character which derogates from the maximum profitability rule which was observed before. The picturesque movement comes from a theory of aesthetics which promotes a more intimate relationship between architecture and landscaped environment. The buildings was designed according to these principles having a wide variety of shapes and producing visual effects through an assortment of volumes and materials. The old Coaticook station is representative of this architecture in particular by its rectangular plan with a rounded end, its complex roof, numerous protrusions such as bay windows and the conical roof porch as well as its elaborate and varied ornamentation. It is a good example of the use of completed picturesque principles in the architecture of railroad stations.

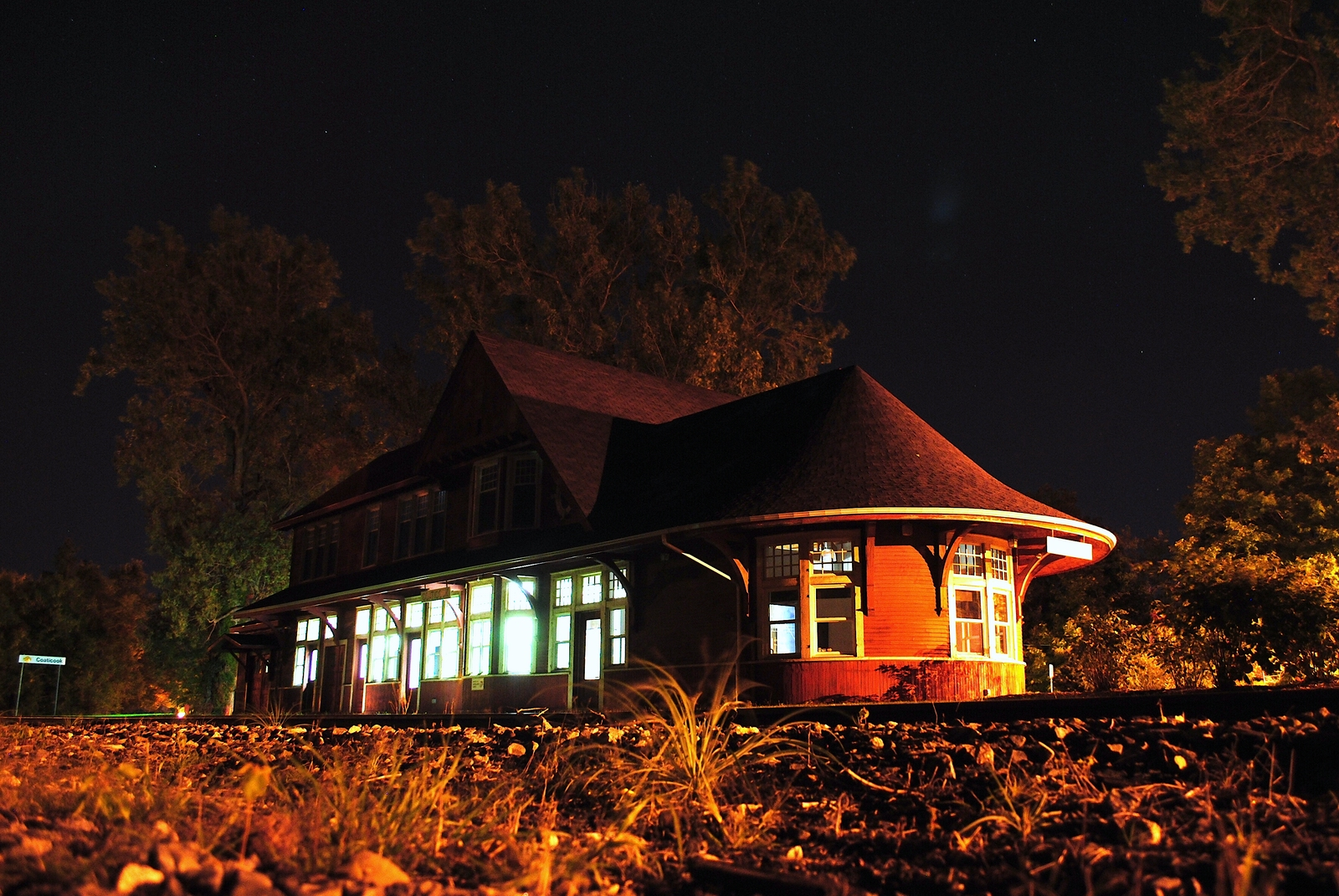
Coaticook Station today.

The heritage value of the old Coaticook station is also based on its historical interest. It shows the importance of the railway in the economic development of the city. Following the construction of the railway, many textile industries and wood and iron processing plants were quickly implanted in Coaticook. The train also drives the growth of the agricultural industry by regularly sending fresh milk to markets in Montreal. In 1904, the old station replaces a first building constructed on the same site in 1853. The passenger train service is interrupted in 1958. Since 1980, freight trains no longer stop in Coaticook. The presence of the old train station in the heart of Coaticook recalls the importance of rail infrastructure in its municipal history.
