= John Thomas Hackett =

Canadian politician

The Honourable John Thomas Hackett QC
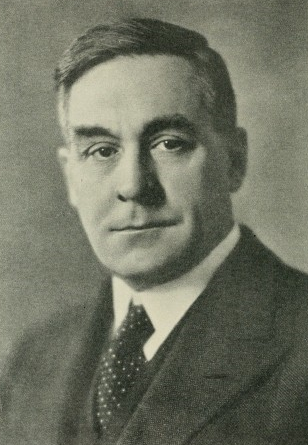

Senator for Victoria, Quebec
- In office July 28, 1955 – September 15, 1956
- Appointed by: Louis St. Laurent
- Preceded by: William James Hushion
- Succeeded by: Josie Alice Quart

Member of the Canadian Parliament for Stanstead
- In office 1930–1935
- Preceded by: Willis Keith Baldwin
- Succeeded by: Robert Davison
- In office 1945–1949
- Preceded by: Joseph-Armand Choquette
- Succeeded by: Louis-Édouard Roberge

19th President of the Canadian Bar Association
- In office 1947–1948
- Preceded by: James Chalmers McRuer
- Succeeded by: Stanley Harwood McCuaig, Q.C., B.A., LL.D.

Personal details
- Born: June 12, 1884 Stanstead, Quebec
- Died: September 15, 1956 (aged 72)
- Party: Conservative; Progressive Conservative
- Spouse: Linda Harding
- Relations: Michael Felix Hackett (father)
- Education: St. Charles Seminary; McGill Law School
- Profession: Lawyer

John Thomas Hackett, QC (June 12, 1884 – September 15, 1956) was a Canadian lawyer and politician. He represented Stanstead in the House of Commons of Canada from 1930 to 1935 and from 1945 to 1949 as a Conservative and then as a Progressive Conservative member. He sat for the Victoria division in the Senate of Canada from 1955 to 1956.

He was born in Stanstead, Quebec, the son of Michael Felix Hackett and Florence Alberta Knight, and was educated at St. Charles Seminary and the law school at McGill University. In 1912, he married Linda Harding. Hackett served as a member of the board of governors for McGill University. He was Batonnier of the Bar Association of Montreal and also President of the Canadian Bar Association, from 1947 to 1948. He was also president of the Stanstead County Historical Society and a lieutenant in the militia.

In 1948, while serving as the president of the Canadian Bar Association and MP for Stanstead, Hackett spoke in the House of Commons against a proposal that the position of chief commissioner of the Board of Transport Commissioners be designated as open only to a judge of the Exchequer Court of Canada. Hackett was concerned that the proposal would blur the lines between the quasi-political and policy role of the Board, compared to the traditional neutrality of judges, and could undermine popular respect for the judiciary as neutral arbiters.

Hackett died in office at the age of 72.

== Electoral record ==
1930 Canadian federal election: Stanstead
Party	Candidate	Votes
Conservative	John Thomas Hackett	5,804
Liberal	Cecil Lorne Brown	3,900
Independent Liberal	Jean-Charles Samson	1,584

1935 Canadian federal election: Stanstead
Party	Candidate	Votes
Liberal	Robert Davison	5,676
Conservative	John Thomas Hackett	5,553
Reconstruction	James Bert Reed	434
