= Timothy Byron Rider =

Canadian politician

Member of the Canadian Parliament for Stanstead
- In office 1891–1896
- Preceded by: Charles Carroll Colby
- Succeeded by: Alvin Head Moore

Personal details
- Born: January 8, 1848 Fitch Bay, Canada East
- Died: December 2, 1917 (aged 69)
- Party: Liberal

Timothy Byron Rider (January 8, 1848 – December 2, 1917) was a merchant and political figure in Quebec, Canada. He represented Stanstead in the House of Commons of Canada from 1891 to 1896 as a Liberal member.

He was born in Fitch Bay, Canada East, the son of Ezra B. Rider who came to Lower Canada from New Hampshire. Rider operated a sawmill and grist mill. In 1871, he married Mary E. Shaw. He was a member of the town council for Stanstead, and served as mayor for eight years; he was also the postmaster at Fitch Bay. Rider defeated Charles Carroll Colby, who had represented the riding for 24 years, to win the 1891 federal election, but was defeated when he ran for reelection in 1896.

== Electoral record ==
1891 Canadian federal election: Stanstead
Party	Candidate	Votes
Liberal	Timothy Byron Rider	1,655
Liberal–Conservative	Charles Carroll Colby	1,553

1896 Canadian federal election: Stanstead
Party	Candidate	Votes
Conservative	Alvin Head Moore	2,018
Liberal	Timothy Byron Rider	1,583
