= Coaticook Gorge =

Gorge in Coaticook, Quebec, Canada

- Gorge de Coaticook
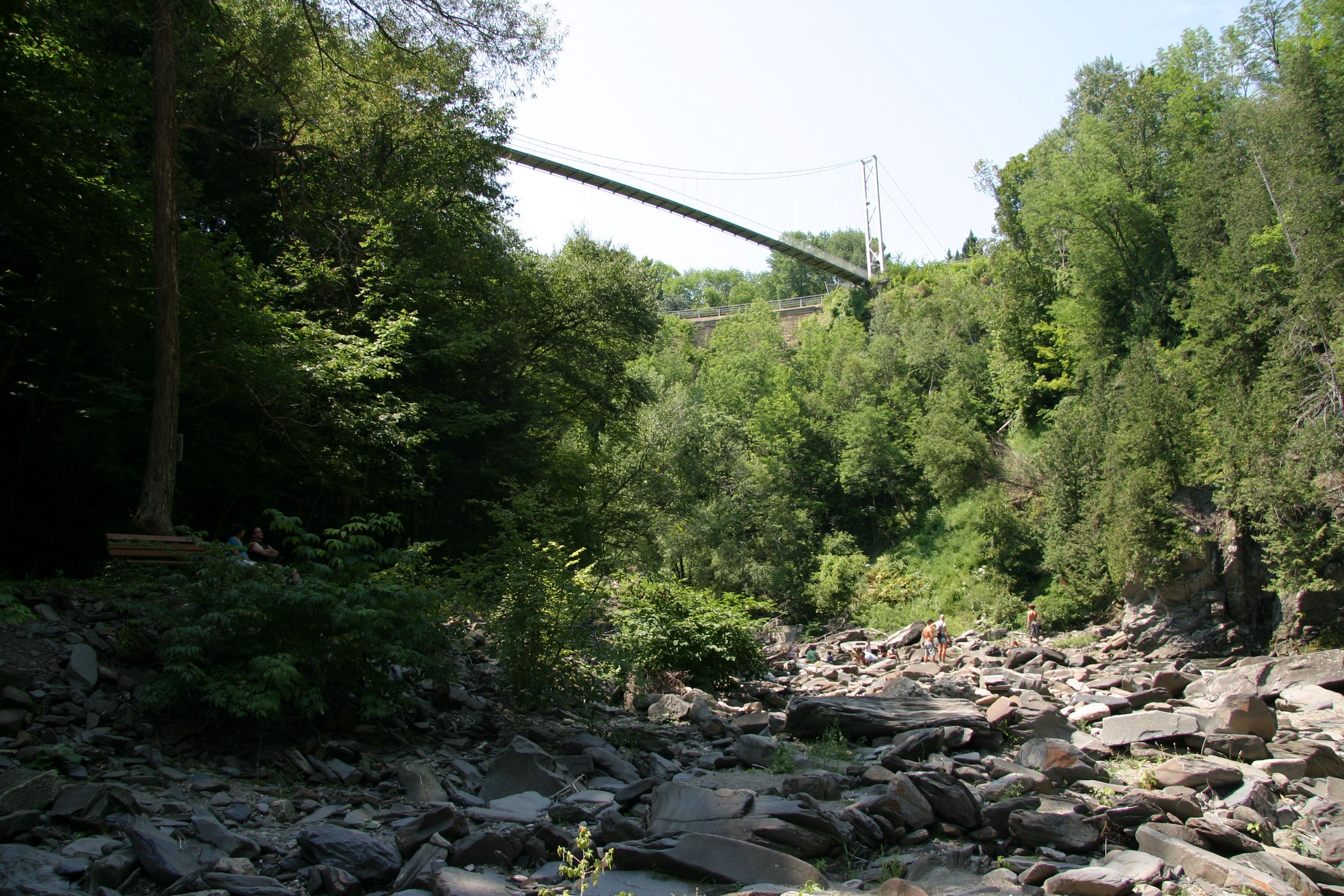
- Length: 750 metres (2,460 ft)
- Depth: 50 metres (160 ft)

Geology
- Age: 15,000 years

Geography
- Location: Coaticook, Quebec, Canada
- Coordinates: 45.1461°N 71.8096°W
- Rivers: Coaticook River
- Interactive map of Coaticook Gorge

The Coaticook Gorge is a gorge in Coaticook, Quebec, Canada, in the Estrie region. The Coaticook River runs through it.

The gorge has a height of 50 metres (160 ft). The length of the gorge is 750 metres (2,460 ft).
