= Charles Carroll Colby =

Canadian lawyer, businessman and politician

The Honourable Charles Carroll Colby PC
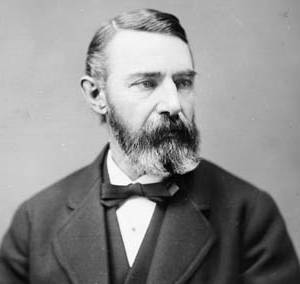

Member of the Canadian Parliament for Stanstead
- In office 1867–1891
- Succeeded by: Timothy Byron Rider

Personal details
- Born: December 10, 1827 Derby, Vermont
- Died: January 10, 1907 (aged 79) Montreal, Quebec
- Party: Liberal-Conservative
- Relations: Moses French Colby, father
- Cabinet: President of the Privy Council (1889-1891)

Charles Carroll Colby, PC (December 10, 1827 – January 10, 1907) was a Canadian lawyer, businessman and politician.

He was born in Derby, Vermont in 1827, the son of Moses French Colby, and came to Stanstead, Quebec with his family in 1832. He studied at Dartmouth College in New Hampshire. He studied law, was called to the Quebec bar in 1855 and entered practice at Stanstead. In 1858, he married Harriet Child. Colby was elected as a Liberal-Conservative MP in the House of Commons of Canada in 1867 representing Stanstead and remained in parliament until his defeat in 1891. He served as President of the Privy Council under Sir John A. Macdonald from 1889 to 1891 and was previously Deputy Speaker and Chairman of Committees of the Whole of the House of Commons. Colby supported the introduction of tariffs to reciprocate against those imposed by the United States. He was a trustee of Stanstead College and a director for several railway companies. Colby served as vice-president of the Quebec Temperance and Prohibitory League.

Colby was the author of Parliamentary government in Canada, published in Montreal in 1886. He died in Montreal at the age of 79.

In 1859, Colby built Carrollcroft, his residence at Stanstead, which now serves as the site of the Colby-Curtis Museum.

== Electoral record ==
1867 Canadian federal election: Stanstead
Party	Candidate	Votes
Liberal–Conservative	Charles Carroll Colby	814
Unknown	Albert Knight	616
Source: Canadian Elections Database

1872 Canadian federal election: Stanstead
Party	Candidate	Votes
Liberal–Conservative	Charles Carroll Colby	acclaimed
Source: Canadian Elections Database

1874 Canadian federal election: Stanstead
Party	Candidate	Votes
Liberal–Conservative	Charles Carroll Colby	acclaimed
Source: lop.parl.ca

1878 Canadian federal election: Stanstead
Party	Candidate	Votes
Liberal–Conservative	Charles Carroll Colby	1,492
Unknown	E.R. Johnson	738

1882 Canadian federal election: Stanstead
Party	Candidate	Votes
Liberal–Conservative	Charles Carroll Colby	1,308
Unknown	H.M. Rider	1,013

1887 Canadian federal election: Stanstead
Party	Candidate	Votes
Liberal–Conservative	Charles Carroll Colby	1,844
Liberal	H.M. Rider	1,410

By-election on 18 December 1889 On Colby being appointed President of the Privy Council, 28 November 1889
Party	Candidate	Votes
Liberal–Conservative	Charles Carroll Colby	acclaimed

1891 Canadian federal election: Stanstead
Party	Candidate	Votes
Liberal	Timothy Byron Rider	1,655
Liberal–Conservative	Charles Carroll Colby	1,553
