= René Létourneau =

Canadian politician

René Joseph Eugène Létourneau

Member of Parliament for Stanstead
- In office March 1958 – April 1963

Personal details
- Born: 17 November 1912 Saint-Paul-de-Montminy, Quebec
- Died: 2 July 1986 (aged 73) Deauville, Quebec
- Party: Progressive Conservative
- Spouse(s): Dolores Rita St.-Laurent m 31 Aug 1935
- Profession: lumber merchant, merchant

René Joseph Eugène Létourneau (17 November 1912 – 2 July 1986) was a Progressive Conservative party member of the House of Commons of Canada. Born in Saint-Paul-de-Montminy, Quebec, he was a lumber merchant and merchant by career.

He first attempted to win Quebec's Stanstead riding in the 1957 federal election but lost to Louis-Édouard Roberge of the Liberal party. Létourneau defeated Roberge in the 1958 election and was re-elected to a second term in 1962. In the 1963 election, Liberal candidate Yves Forest defeated Létourneau at Stanstead. Létourneau made one final attempt to return to Parliament in the 1965 election but was again defeated by Forest.
