= Lyster Lake (Estrie, Canada) =

Lake in Estrie, Canada

Lake Lyster
- Lac Lyster
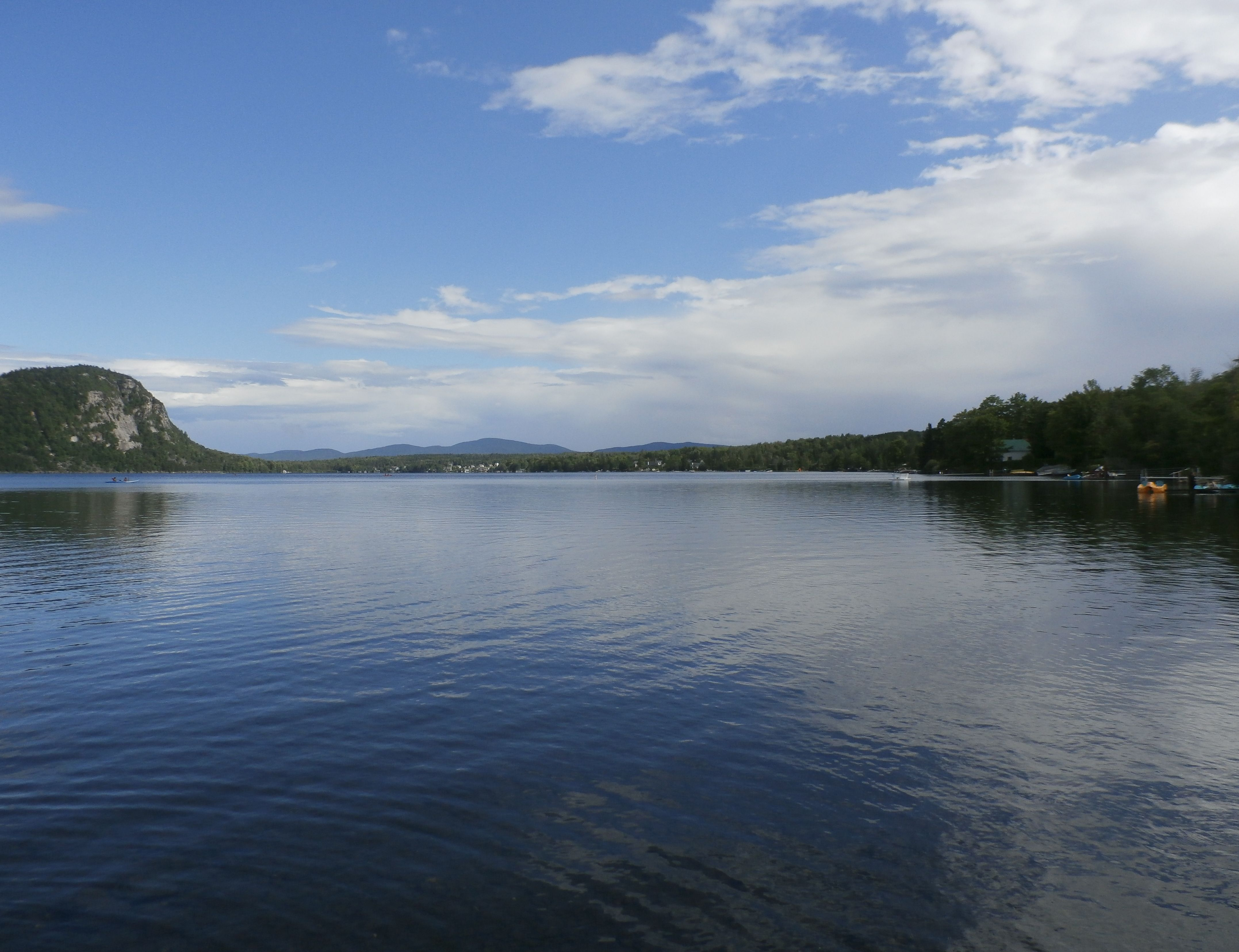
- Lyster Lake seen from the north shore; Mount Pinnacle on the left.

- Location within Quebec Location within Canada
- Location: Coaticook, Coaticook Regional County Municipality, Quebec, Canada
- Coordinates: 45.026°N 71.91°W
- Primary inflows: (clockwise from the mouth) Discharge of Petit lac Baldwin and four streams
- Primary outflows: Niger River
- Basin countries: Canada
- Max. length: 2.4 mi (4 km)
- Max. width: 1.0 mi (2 km)
- Max. depth: 42.8 m (140 ft)
- Surface elevation: 461 m (1,512 ft)

Lac Lyster is a lake located in the municipality of Coaticook (Baldwin Mills), in the Coaticook Regional County Municipality (MRC), in the administrative region of Estrie, in Québec, in Canada.

== Geography ==
The lake is located to the south of the territory of the city of Coaticook, very close to the American border. The hamlet of Baldwin Mill is located on the north shore, Mount Pinacle to the east, and Mount Barnston to the west.

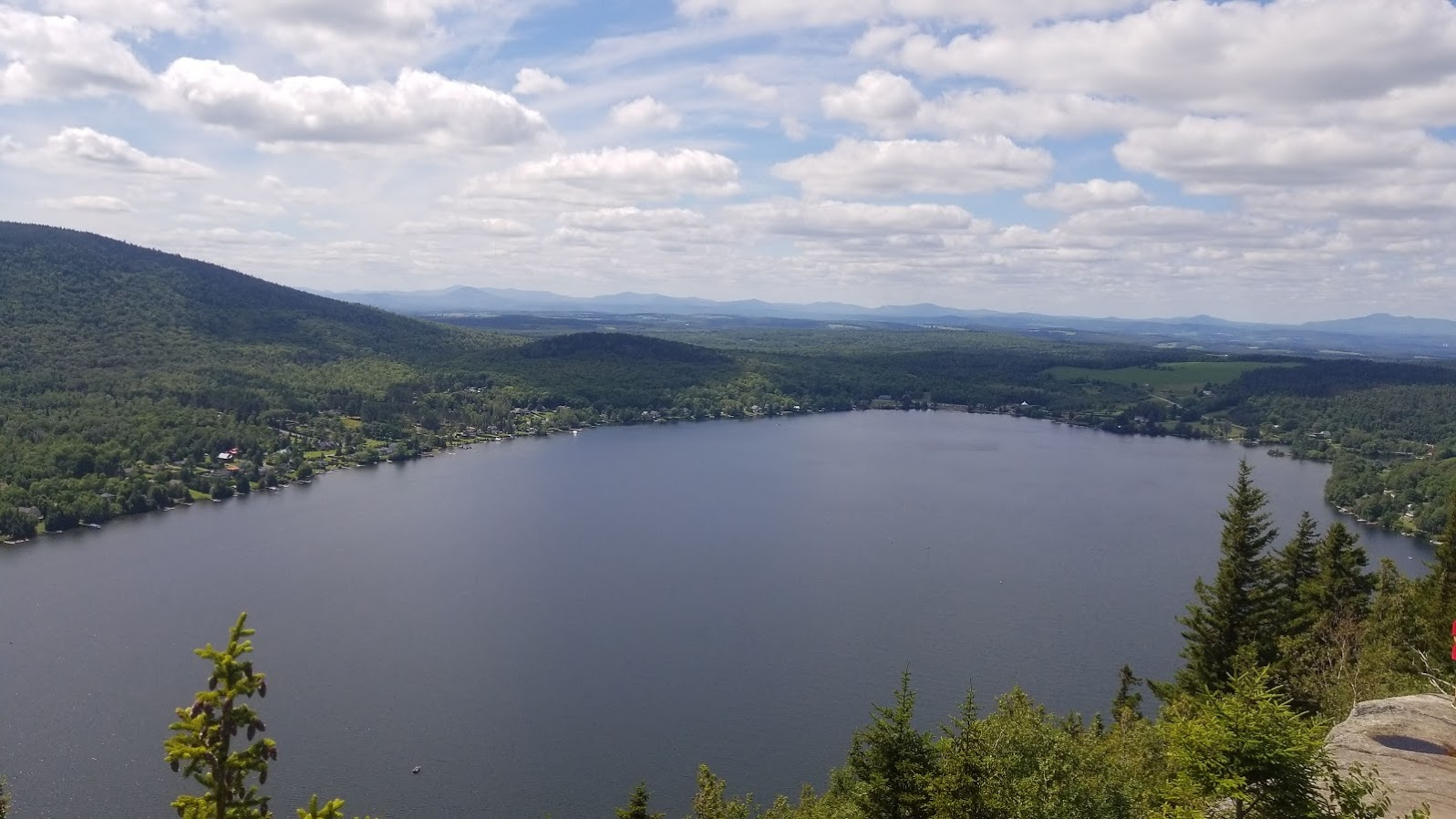
View of Lac Lyster looking west towards the Sutton Mountains

== See also ==
- Tomifobia River
