= Coaticook =

Town in southeastern Quebec, Canada

- City
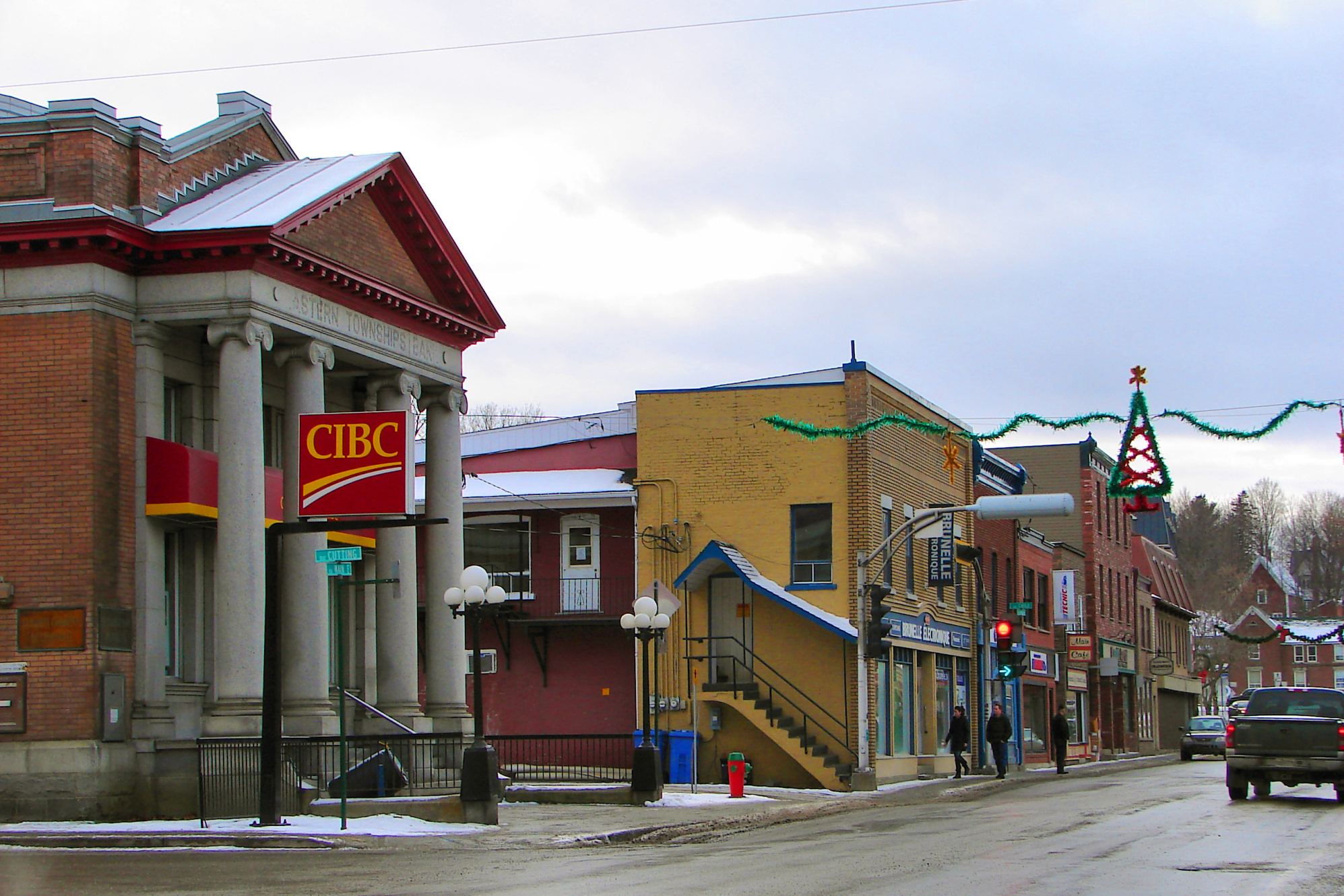
- Main Street
- Nickname: Pearl of the Eastern Townships
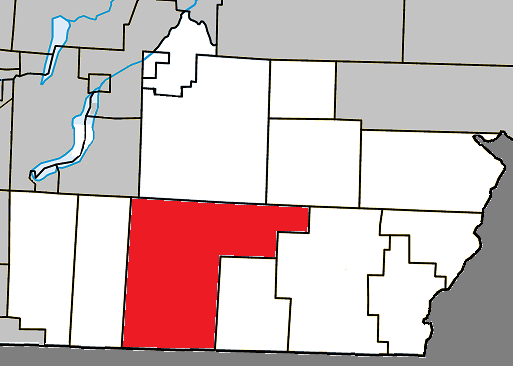
- Location within Coaticook RCM.

- Location in southern Quebec.
- Coordinates: 45°08′N 71°48′W
- Country: Canada
- Province: Quebec
- Region: Estrie
- RCM: Coaticook
- Settled: 1820s
- Incorporated: 1864
- Constituted: December 30, 1998

Government
  - Mayor: Simon Madore
  - Federal riding: Compton—Stanstead
  - Prov. riding: Saint-François

Area
  - Total: 222.73 km^{2} (86.00 sq mi)
  - Land: 219.51 km^{2} (84.75 sq mi)

Population (2021)
  - Total: 8,867
  - Density: 40.4/km^{2} (105/sq mi)
  - Pop 2016-2021: ▲2.2%
  - Dwellings: 4,025
- Time zone: UTC−5 (EST)
  - Summer (DST): UTC−4 (EDT)
- Postal code(s): J1A
- Area codes: 819, 873, 468
- Highways: R-141; R-147; R-208
- Website: www.ville.coaticook.qc.ca

Coaticook (English: /koʊˈætɪkʊk/ koh-AT-ik-uuk, Quebec French: [kwat͡sɪˈkʊk]) is a town on the Coaticook River, located in southeastern Quebec, Canada. It resides in the region of Estrie, which is often referred to colloquially as the Eastern Townships. It is the seat of the Coaticook Regional County Municipality, and its southern border is also the Canada–United States border.

The town of Coaticook was initially settled in the 1820s by British Loyalists coming from New England. The town was incorporated in 1864, and the municipalities of Barnston Township and Barford Township were later merged into Coaticook on December 12, 1998. The absorption of these townships introduced multiple communities to Coaticook that exist to this day, including Baldwin's Mills, Barnston, Ladd's Mills and Stanhope. As of 2021, the population of the municipality of Coaticook was 8,867 with a total area of 222.73 square kilometres (86.00 mi^{2}).

The town of Coaticook is principally known for the Laiterie de Coaticook, the Parc de la Gorge de Coaticook and Foresta Lumina, which bring in a majority of the town's tourists.

The municipality is named after the Coaticook River. The name “Coaticook” is of Abenaki origin, deriving from the term koatikeku, meaning “where the river is bordered by white pines”.

== History ==
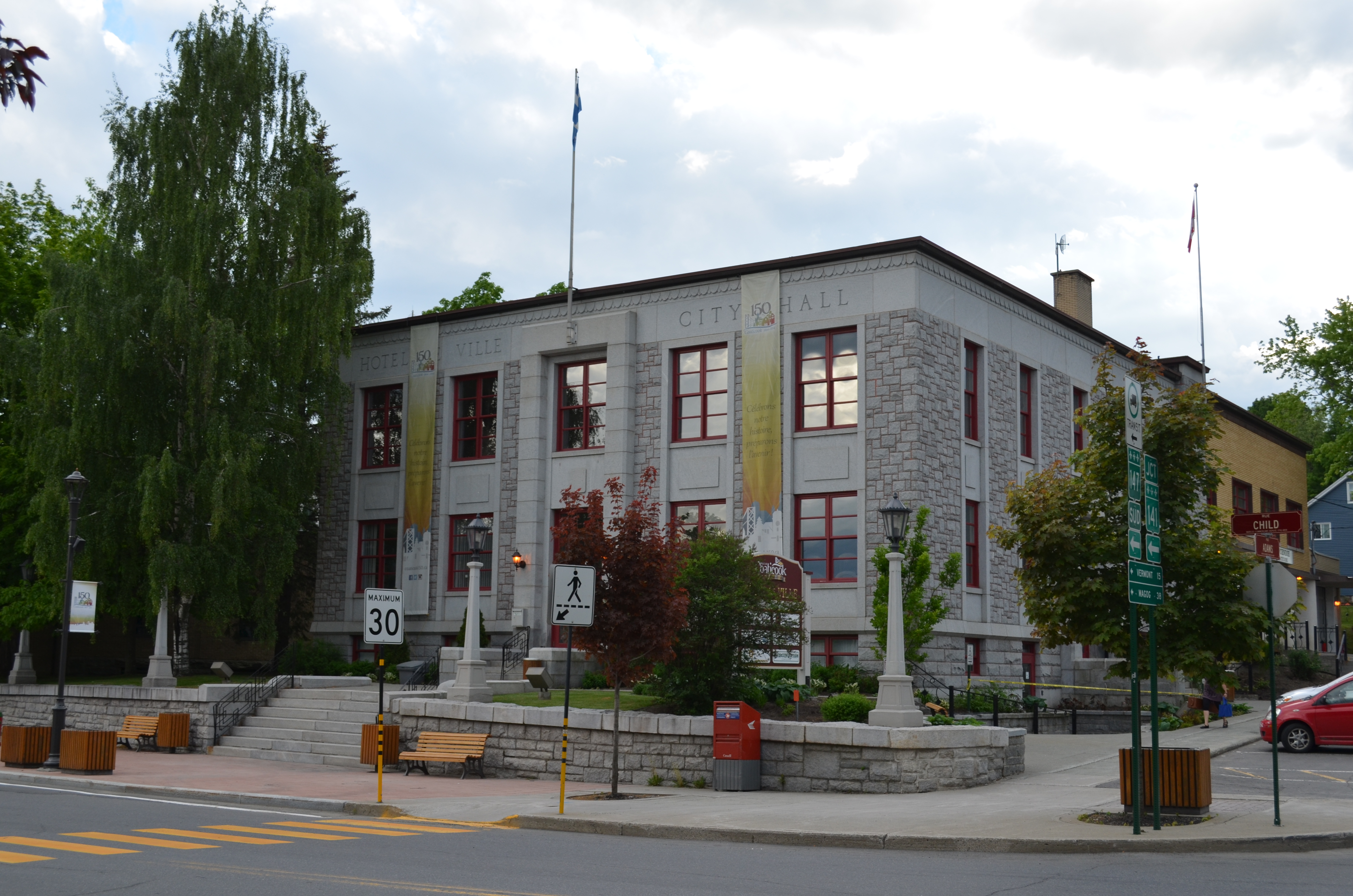
Coaticook city hall

The place was founded in 1818. Richard Baldwin Senior, from Barnston Pinacle cleared a parcel of land where later the City Hall was built. Richard Baldwin son, built the first permanent residence at this place. The area of the Townships of Barnston and Barford was settled in the 1820s and the 1830s by British Loyalists and Americans, mainly from New England. The municipality was finally incorporated in 1864. After the merger of the municipalities of Barnston Township and Barford Township on December 12, 1998, the surface area of the newly created municipality increased considerably.

Coaticook now extends over a total land area of 218.89 square kilometres and the 108 animal farms within its territory, including 66 dairy farms, make it one of Quebec's major milk producers. Coaticook is dubbed the Pearl of the Eastern Townships.

== Geography ==
=== Climate ===
Climate data for Coaticook, Quebec (1991–2020 normals, extremes 1949–2020)
Month	Jan	Feb	Mar	Apr	May	Jun	Jul	Aug	Sep	Oct	Nov	Dec	Year
Record high °C (°F)	17.8 (64.0)	18.9 (66.0)	24.5 (76.1)	29.5 (85.1)	33.0 (91.4)	33.3 (91.9)	35.0 (95.0)	34.4 (93.9)	32.2 (90.0)	28.9 (84.0)	25.0 (77.0)	17.8 (64.0)	35.0 (95.0)
Mean daily maximum °C (°F)	−4.8 (23.4)	−3.2 (26.2)	2.0 (35.6)	9.7 (49.5)	17.7 (63.9)	22.3 (72.1)	24.7 (76.5)	23.7 (74.7)	19.5 (67.1)	12.0 (53.6)	4.9 (40.8)	−1.5 (29.3)	10.6 (51.1)
Daily mean °C (°F)	−9.5 (14.9)	−8.2 (17.2)	−2.7 (27.1)	5.0 (41.0)	12.1 (53.8)	17.1 (62.8)	19.4 (66.9)	18.6 (65.5)	14.4 (57.9)	7.8 (46.0)	1.4 (34.5)	−5.5 (22.1)	5.8 (42.4)
Mean daily minimum °C (°F)	−13.9 (7.0)	−12.8 (9.0)	−7.2 (19.0)	−0.1 (31.8)	6.7 (44.1)	11.8 (53.2)	14.5 (58.1)	13.5 (56.3)	9.3 (48.7)	3.5 (38.3)	−2.5 (27.5)	−9.2 (15.4)	1.1 (34.0)
Record low °C (°F)	−41.7 (−43.1)	−36.1 (−33.0)	−29.4 (−20.9)	−20.0 (−4.0)	−7.8 (18.0)	−2.2 (28.0)	−1.1 (30.0)	−1.1 (30.0)	−5.6 (21.9)	−10.6 (12.9)	−25.0 (−13.0)	−36.1 (−33.0)	−41.7 (−43.1)
Average precipitation mm (inches)	84.5 (3.33)	73.8 (2.91)	80.1 (3.15)	90.1 (3.55)	107.8 (4.24)	129.5 (5.10)	120.4 (4.74)	119.5 (4.70)	103.8 (4.09)	110.0 (4.33)	91.3 (3.59)	105.6 (4.16)	1,216.5 (47.89)
Average rainfall mm (inches)	23.7 (0.93)	12.9 (0.51)	28.9 (1.14)	76.0 (2.99)	105.5 (4.15)	129.5 (5.10)	120.4 (4.74)	119.5 (4.70)	103.8 (4.09)	104.2 (4.10)	62.0 (2.44)	33.3 (1.31)	919.6 (36.20)
Average snowfall cm (inches)	59.3 (23.3)	60.8 (23.9)	51.7 (20.4)	15.0 (5.9)	1.3 (0.5)	0.0 (0.0)	0.0 (0.0)	0.0 (0.0)	0.0 (0.0)	5.3 (2.1)	26.1 (10.3)	71.1 (28.0)	290.6 (114.4)
Average precipitation days (≥ 0.2 mm)	20.6	16.1	16.2	15.3	16.3	16.7	16.4	18.8	18.2	17.8	18.7	20.4	211.4
Average rainy days (≥ 0.2 mm)	4.3	3.7	7.7	13.6	16.1	16.7	16.4	18.8	18.2	17.3	12.5	6.4	151.8
Average snowy days (≥ 0.2 cm)	18.1	14.6	11.2	3.9	0.45	0.0	0.0	0.0	0.0	1.5	8.3	16.5	74.5
Source: Environment Canada

== Demographics ==
In the 2021 Census of Population conducted by Statistics Canada, Coaticook had a population of 8,867 living in 4,023 of its 4,282 total private dwellings, a change of −1% from its 2016 population of 8,955. With a land area of 219.45 km^{2} (84.73 sq mi), it had a population density of 40.4/km^{2} (104.6/sq mi) in 2021.

Canada census – Coaticook community profile

	2021	2016	2011
Population	8,867 (-1.0% from 2016)	8,698 (-6.0% from 2011)	9,255 (+0.6% from 2006)
Land area	219.45 km^{2} (84.73 sq mi)	219.51 km^{2} (84.75 sq mi)	218.57 km^{2} (84.39 sq mi)
Population density	40.4/km^{2} (105/sq mi)	39.6/km^{2} (103/sq mi)	42.3/km^{2} (110/sq mi)
Median age	48.0 (M: 46.0, F: 50.0)	46.5 (M: 44.7, F: 48.0)	44.1 (M: 42.9, F: 45.4)
Private dwellings	4,282 (total) 4,023 (occupied)	3,956 (total)	4,208 (total)
Median household income	$62,000	$50,677	$43,230

Notes: Counts have been adjusted to reflect 2001 Census boundaries.
Population in 1996: 6,653 (+0.2% from 1991) - Population in 1991: 6,637
References: 2021 2016 2011

Mother tongue:

- English as first language: 5.1%
- French as first language: 92.7%
- English and French as first language: 1.3%
- Other as first language: 0.8%

== Attractions ==
=== Laiterie de Coaticook ===
Founded in 1940 by Arthur Bédard, Arthur St-Cyr, and Henri Gérin, the Laiterie initially prepared, bottled, and distributed pasteurized dairy products such as milk, chocolate milk, and cream. Only two years later did the Laiterie begin the production of its quickly-famed ice cream and cheddar cheese. In 1976, under the new administration of Fernand Houle and Émile Provencher, the Laiterie chose to halt the distribution of milk, chocolate milk, and cream. These specializations permitted the Laiterie to position itself firmly on the market. Over the next 50 years, the Laiterie expanded its product range, adding new flavors of ice cream, goat cheese, "Bûche de Noël" cakes, and several other products. Today, still relying on one manufactory, its products are sold province-wide and in New Brunswick.

=== Parc de la Gorge de Coaticook ===
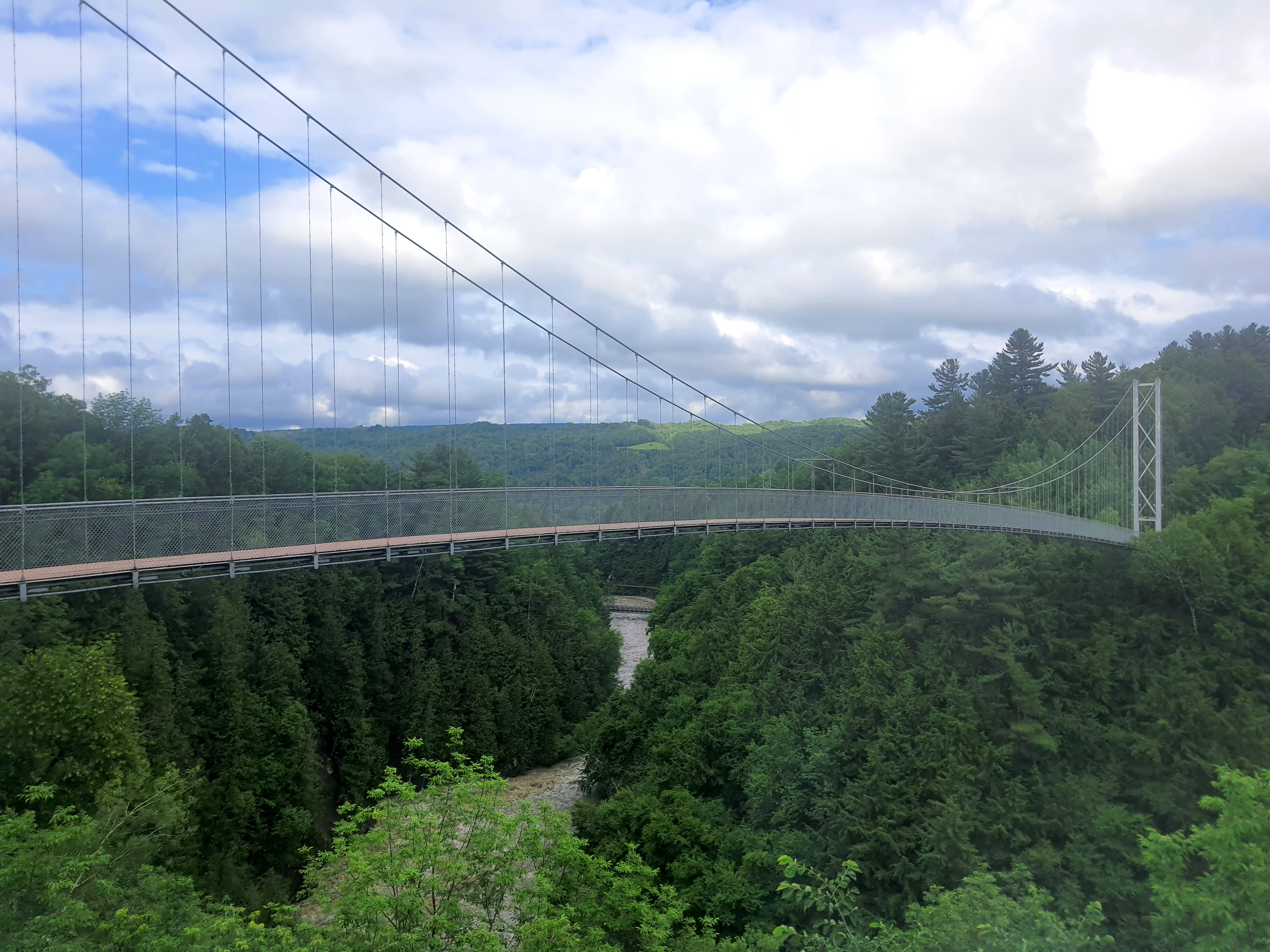
Side view of the suspended footbridge. The Coaticook River is visible below.

First opened in 1975, the Parc de la Gorge de Coaticook is a regional park situated on the Coaticook Gorge. It is a nonprofit organization that offers both summer and winter activities, including camping, hiking trails, a petting zoo, mountain bike trails, and in winter, snowshoeing, fatbike, ice climbing and dog sledding. The Parc de la Gorge de Coaticook brings in more than 225,000 visitors annually, with the principal attraction of the park being its suspension bridge which spans the gorge at 169 meters (554 ft) long. The footbridge dates back to 1988, however it was officially opened the year after, and initially held the title of longest suspended footbridge in the world according to Guinness World Records until 2006, when a footbridge in Japan surpassed it. The Park has two receptions in the town of Coaticook: the first being the Accueil Denis Maurais, renamed after the founder of the Parc de la Gorge de Coaticook in 2016, which gives access to the suspension bridge and Foresta Lumina, and the second being the Accueil du Camping, located in a round barn, which gives access to the park's campgrounds as well as the majority of its trails and other activities. Both receptions also act as shops, selling merchandise and memorabilia connected to the four main activities of the park.

Foresta Lumina was created in 2014, when the Parc de la Gorge de Coaticook commissioned Moment Factory, a Montreal-based design studio, to create a multimedia night walk in one of the park's trails. The 2.6 km (1.6 mi) long experience drew inspiration from local legends, making use of different scenography techniques, a unique soundtrack and a story revolving around a girl named "Margaret". Its first year saw over 70,000 visitors, and in 2015, it received over 145,000. In each of the consecutive years after 2014, large changes or additions were made to Foresta Lumina. In 2018, a projection was added to the downtown of Coaticook, located in Tillotson Place, which is accessible by the main street.

The Parc Découverte Nature is an affiliated organism owned and managed by the Parc de la Gorge de Coaticook. It is located in Baldwin Mills, near Lake Lyster, and offers activities that revolve around fishing. It was first created in 2004, when the municipality of Coaticook obtained 80 hectares of land next to the pisciculture center located in Baldwin Mills. The land was transferred to the Parc de la Gorge de Coaticook and it started year-round activities in May 2006. Today, the Parc Découverte Nature sees more than 11,000 visitors annually and is involved in the conservation of multiple local species of freshwater fish. In August 2019, in collaboration with local and government agencies, it was announced that the Parc Découverte Nature would open an interactive game experience by the summer of 2020. Due to the COVID-19 pandemic, the opening was pushed until July 2021, when it was revealed as Acoatica, an interactive experience with the goal of favoring the survival of different fish species through different interior and exterior activities.

== Sports ==
Coaticook is home to the Coaticook Big Bill of the Ligue de Baseball Senior Élite du Québec, which play their home games in Julien Morin Stadium.

== Infrastructure ==
=== Cemeteries ===
Cemeteries in or near Coaticook include Mount Forest Cemetery, Saint Edmond Cemetery, St-Luc and St-Wilfrid-de-Barnston.

== Gallery ==
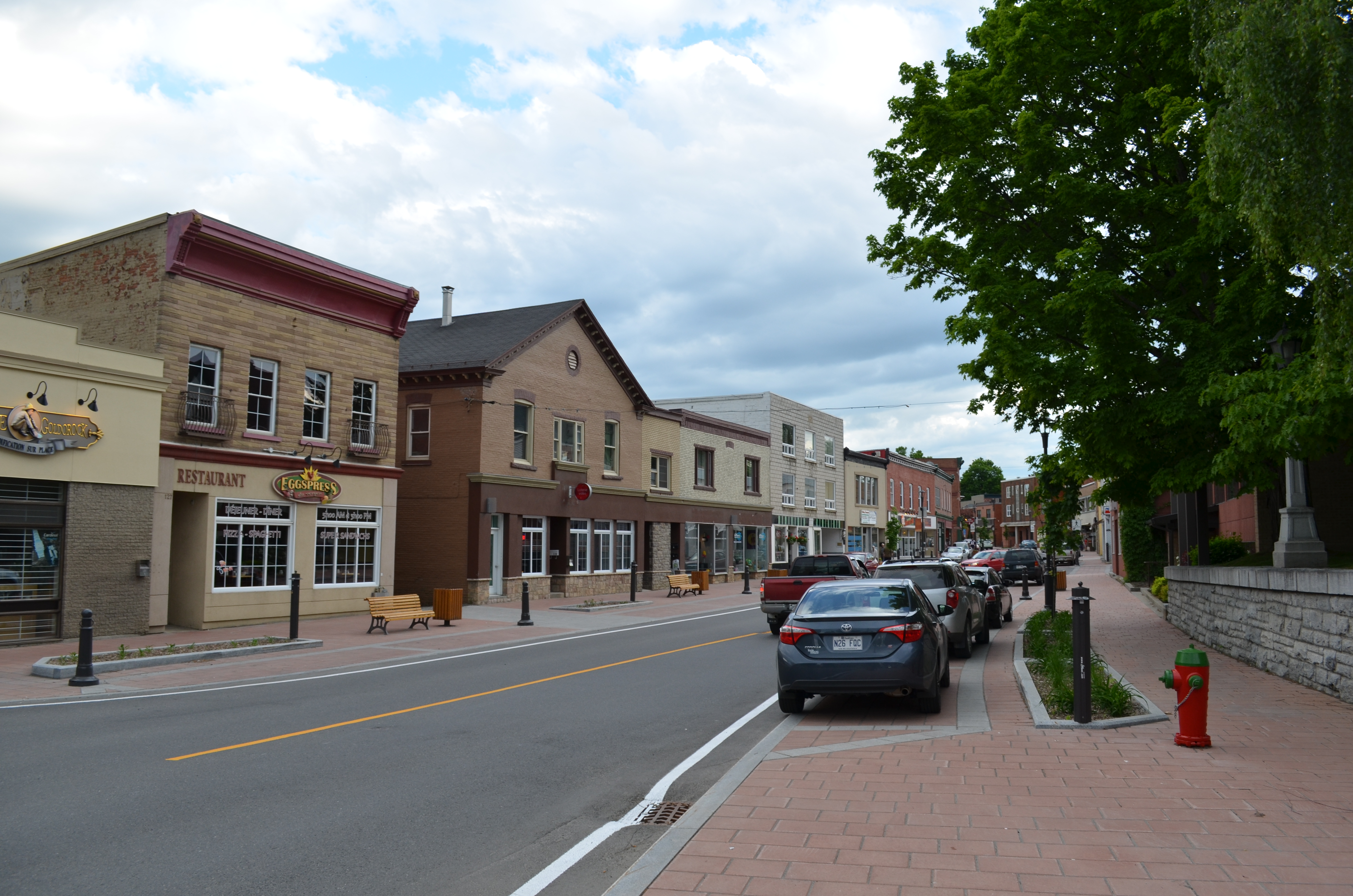
Child street in 2014.

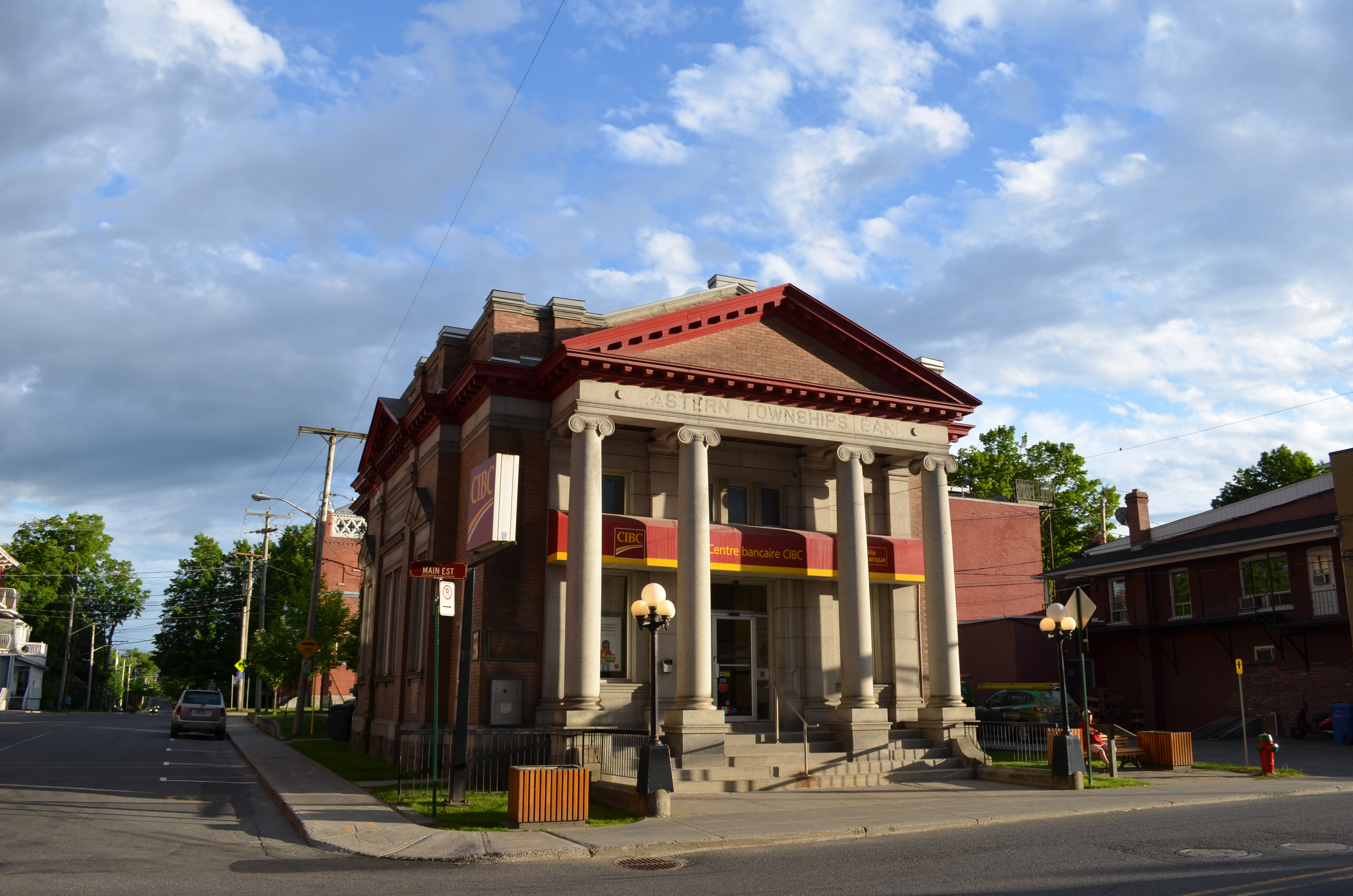
The historic Eastern Townships Bank, now a branch of CIBC.

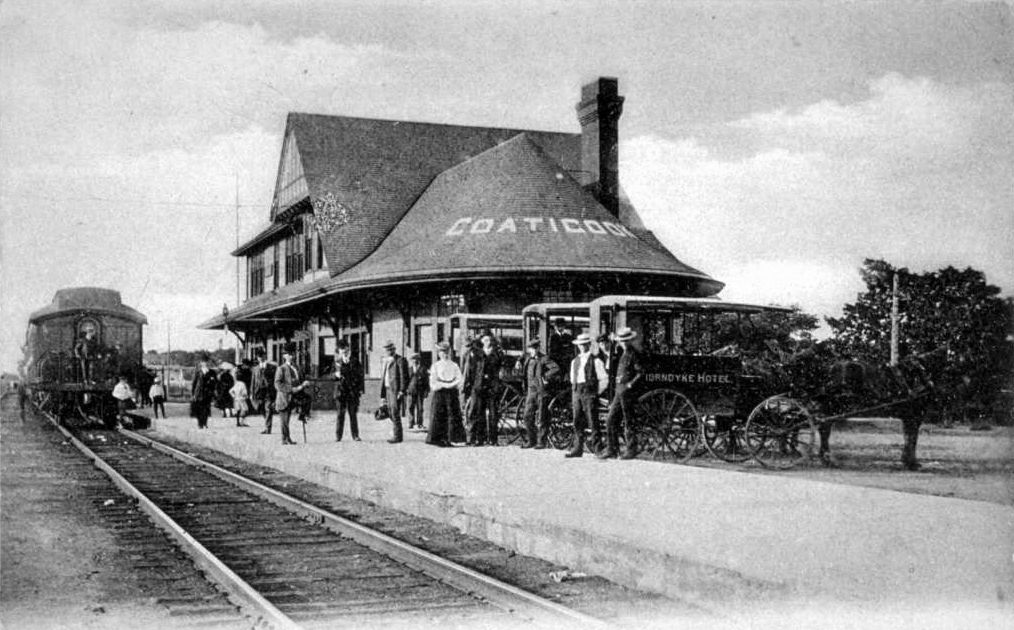
The old Coaticook station, located on the Grand Trunk railway.

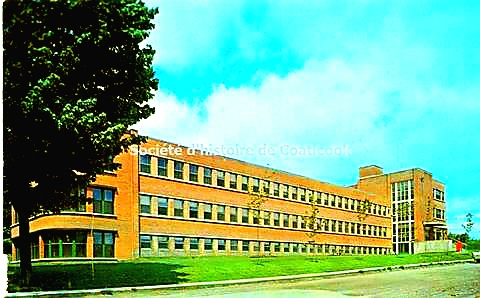
The town's hospital in 1954.

== See also ==
- Grand Trunk Station (Coaticook)
- Norton–Stanhope Border Crossing
