= Westervelt =

Westervelt is a surname. Notable people with the surname include:

- Franklin H. Westervelt (1930–2015), engineer, computer scientist, and educator at the University of Michigan and Wayne State University
- George Conrad Westervelt (1879–1956), co-founder of The Boeing Company, brother of William I. Westervelt, uncle of Peter Westervelt
- Herbert Eugene Westervelt (1858–1938), founder of Gulf States Paper Company and inventor
- Howie Westervelt (1921–1992), American dirt modified racing driver
- Jacob Westervelt (1794–1881), Sheriff of New York County from 1831 to 1834
- Jacob Aaron Westervelt (1800–1879), shipbuilder in the mid-19th century, and a mayor of New York City between 1853 and 1855
- Peter Westervelt (1919–2015), physicist, son of William I. Westervelt, nephew of George Conrad Westervelt
- Robert M. Westervelt (b. 1949), physicist and educator at Harvard University
- William Drake Westervelt (1849–1939), author of several books and magazines on Hawaiian history and legends
- William Irving Westervelt (1876–1960), US Army general, brother of George Conrad Westervelt, father of Peter Westervelt
