= Lake Region Union High School =

Coordinates: 44.7827181°N 72.2207283°W

- Barton, Vermont, United States

Information
- Type: Secondary school
- Motto: WE ARE LR
- Established: 1967
- Principal: Andrew Kulak
- Teaching staff: 33.50 (FTE)
- Grades: 9-12
- Enrollment: 353 (2023-2024)
- Student to teacher ratio: 10.54
- Nickname: Rangers
- Affiliation: Public
- Website: http://www.lruhs.org/

Lake Region Union High School, commonly known as Lake Region, is a secondary school located in Barton, in the U.S. state of Vermont. The school is operated by the Orleans Central Supervisory Union school district.

The school serves students from Barton, Orleans, Irasburg, Albany, Brownington, Glover, Coventry and Westmore.

== History ==
The building was opened in 1967 to replace two high schools in the Town of Barton, Orleans High School and Barton Academy. Each was formerly served by its own school district; the new school by a unified school district encompassed the two former districts.

== Administrative ==
The budget for 2007–08 was $5,886,918. The school board expected this to top $6 million in 2009–2010.

In 2010, the school stood twelfth academically in the state on the NECAP exam, despite being located in the third-poorest school district in the state.

In 2021, the school lunches were free and free take home lunches for remote schooling due to the COVID-19 pandemic. Freshman and sophomore classes were in person Mondays and Thursdays while being remote the rest of the week, upperclassmen were in person Tuesdays and Fridays. None of the grades had in person classes on Wednesdays.

== Recognition ==
- Boys' baseball, division II state champions, 2018
- Boys' soccer, division II state champions, 2016, 2017
- Girls' golf, division II state champions, 2014
- Boys' basketball division III state champions, 2008
- Girls' basketball division III state champions 2009 Girls' basketball, Class I state champions 1974
- Boys' cross country state champions, Class I, 1970
- Boys' cross-country skiing, Division II state champions, 1993-4
- Girls' Field Hockey, Division II state champions, 1992-4
- Golf, Division II state champions, 1995
- Girls' Track, Class I state champions, 1971

In 2008, the school exceeded state averages in every category except science on the standardized NECAP tests. Improvements over 2007 were "notable." The school stood ninth out of 65 high schools in reading, fourteenth in math, and seventeenth in writing.

In 2009, the school had the highest mathematics and reading proficiency of three county high schools on the standardized tests, 65%. The state average was 52%. It also had the highest percentage of students qualifying for free lunch, 49%. The state average was 31%. In 2010 and 2011, the school had the highest grades in the county in reading, and writing. It had the highest percentage of students qualifying for free lunches, 52%.

In 2011, the principal was selected as the state's "Principal of the Year."

In 2013, U.S. News & World Report ranked the high school third in Vermont, up from seventh in 2012.

In 2012, on the standardized NECAP, economically disadvantaged eleventh graders stood higher than those who were better off, contrary to expectations.

== Student life ==
The school holds poetry slams, and offers a variety of musical activities, including chorus, band, jazz band, and select chorus.

== Athletics ==
The school offers boys' and girls' sports teams for the following seasons:

- Fall: soccer, cross country, golf
- Winter: basketball, indoor track, snowboarding
- Spring: baseball, softball, track and field

== Academics ==
Classes are conducted during four blocks from 8:15 to 3:00.

There are several after school programs including chess club, cooking club, homework club, and the newspaper club.

The school offers Advanced Placement courses.

Starting with the class of 2013, students were required to complete a minimum of 80 hours of community service to graduate, though now that requirement has been changed to 40 hours as of 2026.
