= Orleans Central Supervisory Union =

School district in USA

Location
- Barton, Vermont United States
- Coordinates: 44.7525°N 72.1909°W

District information
- Type: Public

Other information
- Website: https://www.ocsu.org/

The Orleans Central Supervisory Union is a school district responsible for the education of students in the Vermont towns of Albany, Barton, Brownington, Glover, Irasburg, Orleans, and Westmore. This requires maintaining one elementary school in each of these towns (except Westmore), plus the Lake Region Union High School, in Orleans. The union is headquartered in Orleans.

== Lake Region Union High School Board ==
The Lake Region Union High School school board consists of the following members, elected by the various participating towns and villages:

- Chairman - Dave Thurber, Brownington
- Vice Chairman - Linda Michneiweicz, Westmore
- Clerk - Darlene Young, Glover
- Orleans - Dave Blodgett, Toni Eubanks
- Albany - Maybeth Whitten
- Barton - Dan Lussier, Wendy Poutre
- Irasburg - Michael Sanville, Renee Fontaine

The OCSU Board is chaired by Dan Lussier of Barton with Vice-Chair Thea Swartz of Orleans.

- Superintendent (appointed) - Stephen Urgenson (contract expires 2010)
- Business Manager (appointed) - Susan Watson

== History ==
In 2004, the district sent certain at-risk students to Wheeler Mountain Academy. In 2008, they announced that they would terminate this relationship in 2009.

In 2008, Union students' performance on the standardized New England Common Assessment Program tests appeared to outperform the North Country Supervisory Union (eight out of ten worst performing).

Required by the state to do so, it furnished a part-time interventionist at the parochial St. Paul's school in 2010.
