= Barton, Vermont =

- Town
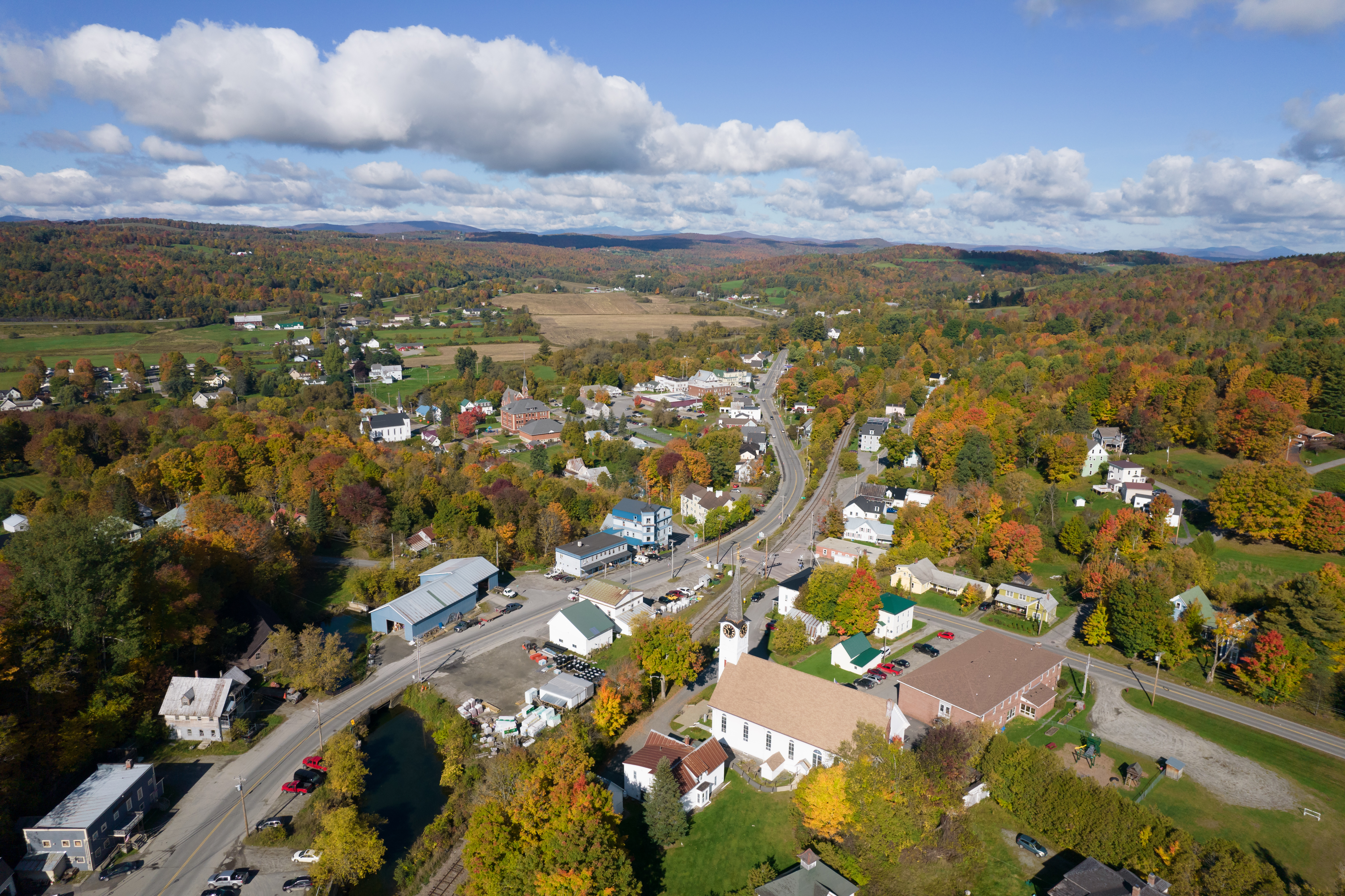
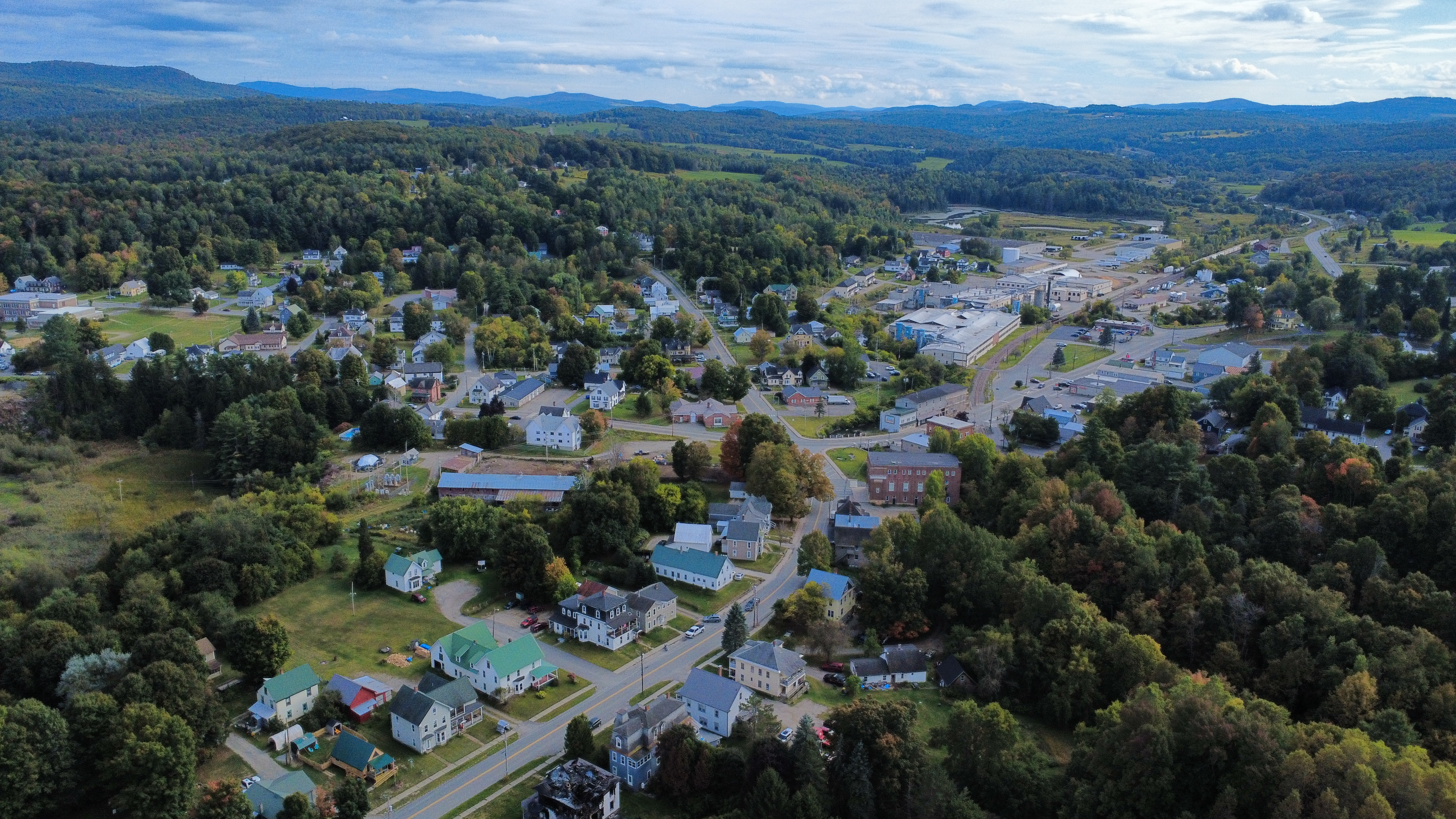
- Aerial view of Barton, VT, from the southeast Aerial view of Orleans, VT, from the north

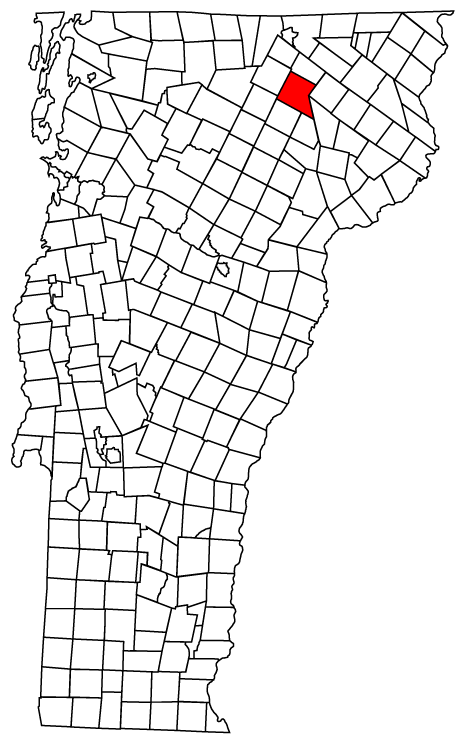
- Located in Orleans County, Vermont
- Coordinates: 44°44′49″N 72°11′12″W
- Country: United States
- State: Vermont
- County: Orleans
- Chartered: October 20, 1789
- Communities: Barton; Orleans; Willoughby

Area
  - Total: 44.9 sq mi (116.3 km^{2})
  - Land: 43.7 sq mi (113.1 km^{2})
  - Water: 1.3 sq mi (3.3 km^{2})
- Elevation: 1,224 ft (373 m)

Population (2020)
  - Total: 2,872
  - Density: 66/sq mi (25.4/km^{2})
- Time zone: UTC−5 (EST)
  - Summer (DST): UTC−4 (EDT)
- ZIP Codes: 05822, 05839, 05875 (Barton); 05860 (Orleans)
- Area code: 802
- FIPS code: 50-03550
- GNIS feature ID: 1462037
- Website: www.bartonvermont.com

Barton is a town in Orleans County, Vermont, United States. The population was 2,872 at the 2020 census. The town includes two incorporated villages, Barton and Orleans. Approximately a quarter of the town's population lives in each of the villages, and approximately half lives outside the villages. Only four other towns in the state contain two incorporated villages.

The Nulhegan Abenaki Tribe, a state-recognized tribe, is headquartered here.

== History ==
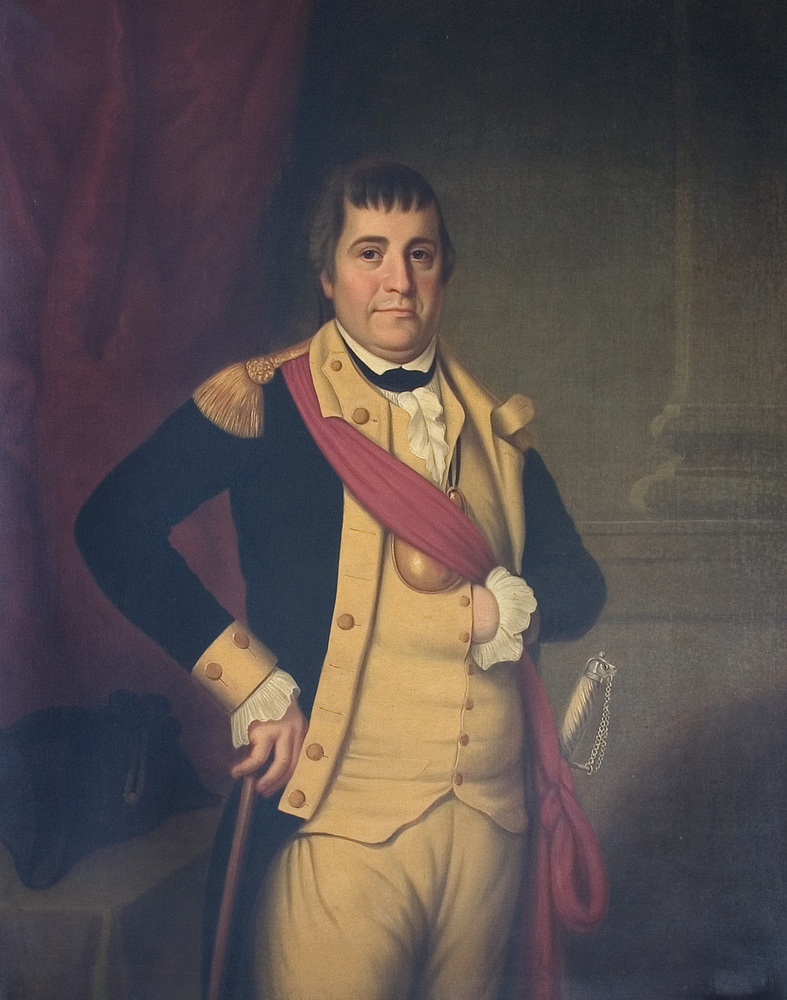
William Barton, after whom the town is named

The Abenaki and their ancestors had been in this area for 12,000 years. They were part of the large Wabanaki confederacy of related Algonguian-speaking peoples that extended into what is now Canada. In 2011 and 2012 the state of Vermont officially recognized four Abenaki tribes. The Nulhegan Abenaki Tribe has its headquarters in Barton.

Early European traders and colonists were French. Anglo-Americans began to enter the area later in the 18th century. Both groups pushed the Abenaki aside when they wanted the land, and the natives suffered high mortality due to new infectious diseases.

France and England continued their European competition in North America, including in wars of the early 18th century. There was frequent raiding by each group of colonists and their Native American allies between their settlements, leading to a brisk trade in ransomed captives.

The French and Indian War was the North American front of the Seven Years' War later in the century. In the latter warfare, Rogers' Rangers attacked Saint-Francis, Quebec in 1759, but were forced to retreat. They came through this area, splitting their forces before reaching Barton. One group followed the Barton River south to the falls at the outlet of Crystal Lake, where they caught fish to eat. They continued south over the summit into the Passumpsic River Valley.

After the American Revolutionary War and independence, Barton was chartered on October 20, 1789. The land was granted in lieu of pay to 60 Revolutionary War veterans, mainly from Rhode Island. They included Admiral John Paul Jones, General William Barton after whom the town was named, and Ira Allen. Prior to formal chartering, the town had been known as "Providence."

From 1791 to 1793 Timothy Hinman built what is now called the Hinman Settler Road, linking Barton south to Greensboro and north through Brownington to Derby and Canada. The early Anglo-American settlers of Barton found wigwams, in a decayed condition, quite numerous in the vicinity of the outlet of Barton pond. They realized that this had been a favorite camping ground of the Abenaki. They noted that Foosah, an Abenaki, said that he had killed 27 moose, besides large numbers of beaver and otter, near this pond in the winter of 1783–1784.

On June 6, 1810, the body of water known today as Runaway Pond flooded the Barton River Valley, resulting in widespread destruction. Its effects can still be seen today. In 1824, voters decided to fund education for all children, establishing public schools. A private academy started operating in 1852 with 107 students. This was the forerunner of Barton Academy.

Railroad construction reached Barton in 1858. The first train arrived in 1863. As each new railroad terminus was built, the stagecoaches used them as well. The stage ran north from Barton, from what is now the junction of State Road 58 and US 5, to connect with the Hinman Settler Road. It came from Glover and ran up Barton Hill, over what is now Maple Hill Road, and on to what is now the Orleans Country Club; from there it went to Brownington.

Fred Kimball opposed slavery and became an agent on the Underground Railroad before the Civil War, assisting refugee slaves from the South to reach freedom in Vermont or pass into Canada. Some of the refugees wanted to get as far as possible from slave catchers, who became more aggressive as bounties were increased after the 1850 Fugitive Slave Act.

Some 182 men from the town volunteered to fight in the Civil War. By 1863, enthusiasm for the war had waned, and Congress passed legislation to start a draft of soldiers. Individuals were allowed to buy their way out of the draft for $300, a steep sum for many men at the time, or find a substitute, usually paying a bounty of $100. Barton's quota was 14. Of the 14 men originally drafted, seven bought their way out, and six obtained a substitute. One served.

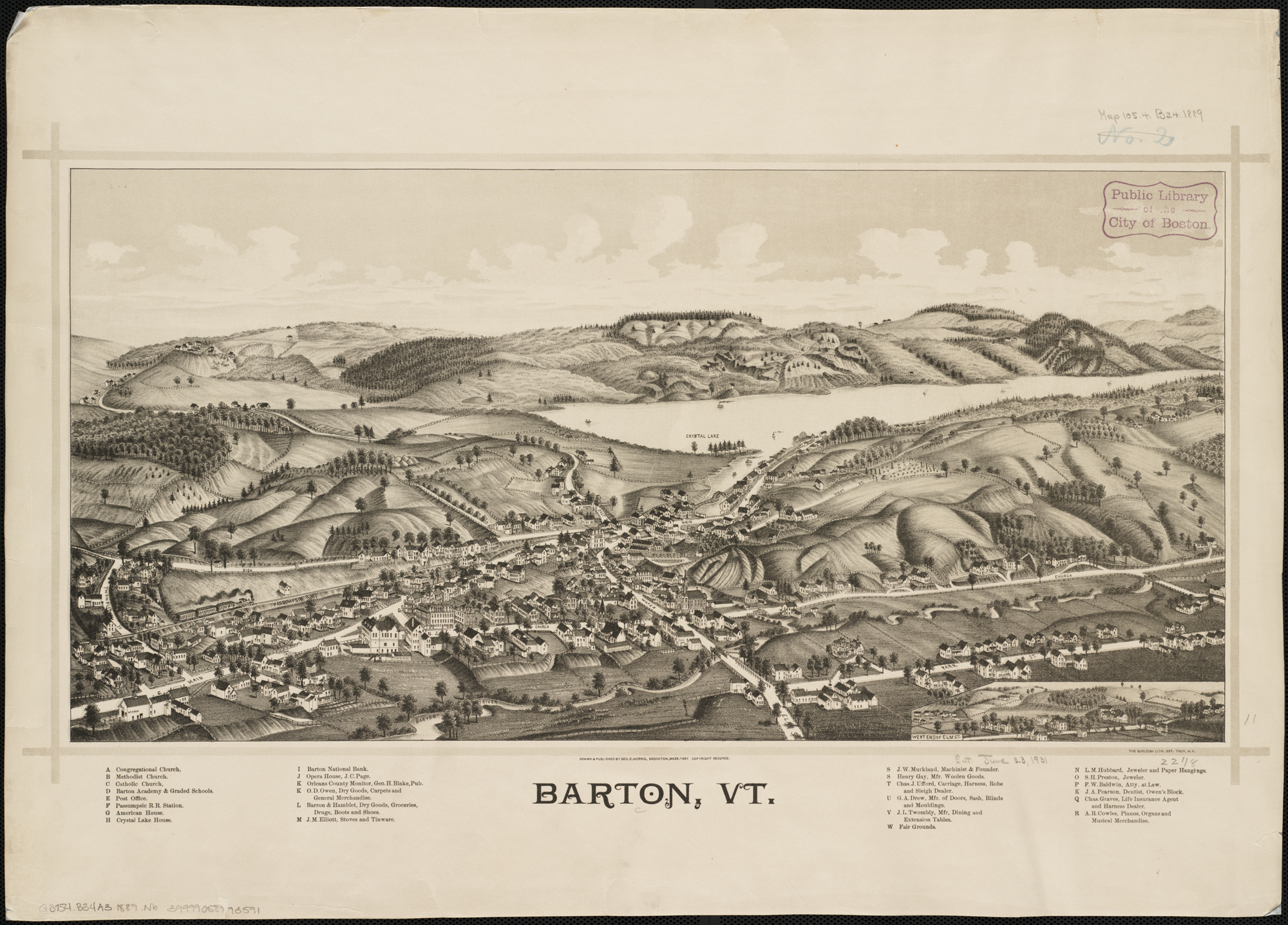
Illustration of Barton, VT, from 1889

The town had a total of seven granite quarries, which were a mainstay of the economy. Around 1900, a granite quarry was located on the east side of Crystal Lake. Steamboats carried stone by barges across the lake. In winter, barges were slid across on the ice.

In 1907 excavation for the new Barton Academy revealed an Abenaki burying ground. There is no record of what happened to the artifacts that were discovered in the graves.

Increasing steadily, Barton's population reached a peak of 3,506 people in 1920. In 1921, the town put on a large pageant celebrating its 125th anniversary. A professional choreographer and playwright was hired. 300 townspeople performed, and they were watched by 4,500 paying spectators, a record audience for the county at the time. The investment of $1,000 was recouped. The festival area was afterwards known as Pageant Park, which is now owned by the Barton village.

Following the outbreak of World War II, the Portland Pipeline company built a crude oil pipeline to Montreal, Canada from Portland, Maine in 1941. It wanted to avoid the risk of U-Boat attacks that resulted from shipping by sea. In 2005, the portion of the line that passes through Barton town was evaluated and taxed at $2,277,000.

The last one-room schools stopped operation in the late 1950s. In 1964, a candlepin bowling alley was opened. Up to ten community leagues used the facility. It closed in 2000 after some legal problems.

In 1967, the school districts found that their high schools, Barton Academy and Orleans High School, were too small to accommodate current needs. They converted them to elementary school use and built a new facility, Lake Region Union High School.

On February 14, 2016, the temperature dropped to −20 °F (−29 °C). The high for the day was −18 °F (−28 °C). There had been insufficient snow to insulate homes against the cold, and a life-threatening emergency developed after electric power failed. It was off for 12 hours, jeopardizing the lives of many residents, particularly the elderly, among those who depended on electrical fired furnaces. Exterior electrical generators could not be started due to the cold. Plumbing froze and burst in many houses.

=== South Barton ===
The unincorporated village of South Barton, sometimes called Kimball Station, no longer exists. It was located near the Wheeler Mountain Road south of Crystal Lake on present-day Route 5.

In 1858, Barton (and Orleans County) obtained a triangular piece of land from Sheffield which included all of May Pond, the entire area south of Crystal Lake, and the village of South Barton. In 1861, the village of South Barton had its own post office, and, in 1874, its own railroad depot. In the early 1930s, 30 students attended its one-room schoolhouse.

Its main industry was logging. The village foundered because it lacked electric power, which the other two villages in town had aggressively pursued getting installed. South Barton tried to rely on steam power, but by the early 1940s, the village was no longer viable. Its post office closed in 1947. Three industries operated successively in the same location: the Orleans and Caledonia Steam Mill Company, Willoughby Wood and Lumber Company, and US Bobbin and Shuttle Company. Eventually the relocation of the latter to New York state took enough jobs that remaining residents left the village.

== Geography ==
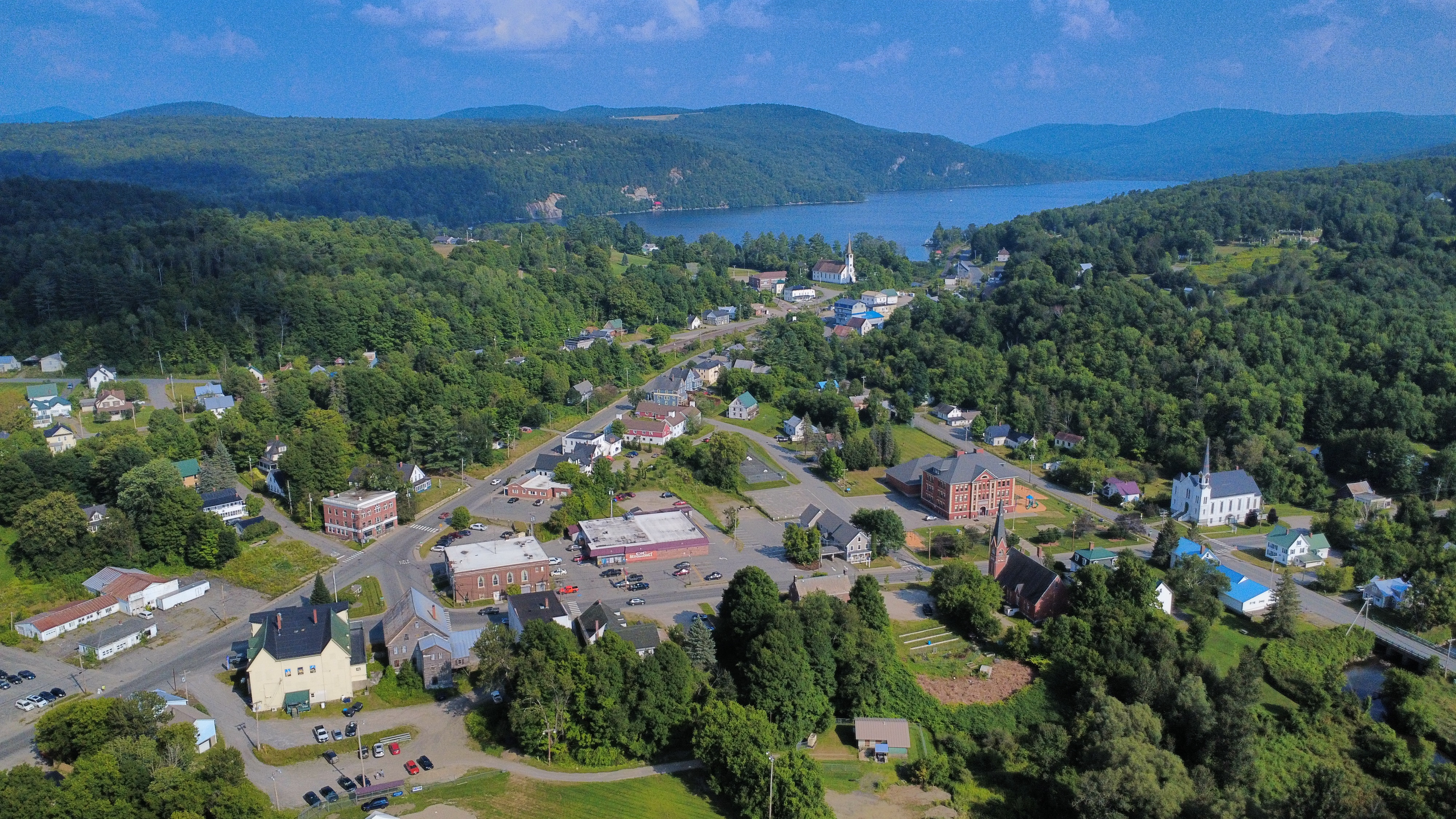
View of Barton, VT, from the west, showing nearby Crystal Lake

According to the United States Census Bureau, the town has a total area of 44.9 square miles (116.3 km^{2}), of which 43.7 square miles (113.1 km^{2}) is land and 1.3 square miles (3.3 km^{2}) (2.81%) is water. Barton averages 931 feet (284 m) above sea level (ASL).

The principal rock is calciferous mica schist. About two miles (3 km) from the Irasburg line, and parallel with it, there is a narrow vein of hornblende schist the whole length of the town. In the eastern corner, covering an area of several square miles, the rocks are a mixture of granite, syenite, and protogine. Iron has been found in small quantities, and some traces of gold.

The highest peak in Barton is Barton Mountain – 2,235 feet (681 m) ASL. May Hill is 2,007 feet (612 m) high.

Rivers include the Barton, and Willoughby; Hogtrough Brook, Lord Brook, Annis Brook, May Pond Brook, Willoughby Brook, and Roaring Brook. Each spring, the migrating rainbow trout swim up the Willoughby River to spawn in Lake Willoughby.

Crystal Lake State Park is located in Barton.

== Government ==
=== Town ===
- Moderator: William Boyd Davies
- Selectman: Jim Greenwood
- Selectman: Robert Croteau
- Selectmen: Mike Pion
- Town Clerk: Kristin Atwood

The Selectmen's Budget was $310,100 in 2008; the Highway Budget was $441,900.

=== Legislature ===
The Essex-Orleans Senate district includes the town of Barton, as well as parts or all of Essex County, Orleans County, Franklin County and Lamoille County. It is represented in the Vermont Senate by John S. Rodgers (D) and Robert A. Starr (D).

In the Vermont House of Representatives, Barton forms part of the Orleans-Caledonia-1 district. Its representatives are Vicki Strong (R) and Sam Young (D).

=== Education ===
The town is a key member of the Orleans Central Supervisory Union. Spending per pupil in 2007 was $10,364, slightly below the state average of $11,095.

== Demographics ==
Historical population
Census	Pop.	Note	%±
1800	128		—
1810	447		249.2%
1820	372		−16.8%
1830	726		95.2%
1840	852		17.4%
1850	987		15.8%
1860	1,590		61.1%
1870	1,911		20.2%
1880	2,364		23.7%
1890	2,217		−6.2%
1900	2,790		25.8%
1910	3,346		19.9%
1920	3,506		4.8%
1930	3,469		−1.1%
1940	3,371		−2.8%
1950	3,298		−2.2%
1960	3,066		−7.0%
1970	2,874		−6.3%
1980	2,990		4.0%
1990	2,967		−0.8%
2000	2,780		−6.3%
2010	2,810		1.1%
2020	2,872		2.2%
U.S. Decennial Census

As of the census of 2000, there were 2,780 people, 1,153 households, and 748 families residing in the town. The population density was 63.7/sq mi(24.6/km^{2}). There were 1,438 housing units at an average density of 32.9 per square mile (12.7/km^{2}). The racial makeup of the town was 97.37% White, 0.32% Black or African American, 0.40% Native American, 0.18% Asian, 0.07% from other races, and 1.65% from two or more races. Hispanic or Latino of any race were 0.29% of the population.

There were 1,153 households, out of which 32.0% had children under the age of 18 living with them, 49.6% were married couples living together, 10.1% had a female householder with no husband present, and 35.1% were non-families. Of all households, 30.4% were made up of individuals, and 16.7% had someone living alone who was 65 years of age or older. The average household size was 2.33 and the average family size was 2.86.

In the town, the age distribution of the population shows 24.8% under the age of 18, 6.6% from 18 to 24, 25.9% from 25 to 44, 24.3% from 45 to 64, and 18.4% who were 65 years of age or older. The median age was 41 years. For every 100 females, there were 94.5 males. For every 100 females age 18 and over, there were 91.1 males.

== Economy ==
=== Personal income ===
The median income for a household in the town was $28,797, and the median income for a family was $33,872. Males had a median income of $25,922 versus $20,938 for females. The per capita income for the town was $14,636. About 12.2% of families and 15.8% of the population were below the poverty line, including 21.7% of those under age 18 and 17.0% of those age 65 or over.

=== Tourism ===
Prior to 2010, a study was taken which showed that second home ownership in town was 30%; this was similar to other locations across the county. Most seasonal residents come in the summer, and tourism is important to the economy.

=== Industry ===
Ethan Allen Manufacturing, in the village of Orleans, employs about 400 workers locally.

A nursing home with 71 beds employs 70 people.

=== Utilities and communication ===
==== Landline ====
Consolidated Communications of Northern New England.

==== Cellphone ====
Barton is served by Verizon and AT&T.

==== Electricity ====
The Barton side of Barton town is served by Barton Electric, which generates some of its power hydroelectrically to 2100 customers (households).

The Orleans side of Barton town is served by The Village of Orleans Electric with 665 customers (households).

==== Water and sewage ====
Water is separately distributed to local village residents in Barton and Orleans. Barton charges $59.50 per 5,000 US gallons (19,000 L; 4,200 imp gal); Orleans charges $24. Sewage is charged by the same water meter usage, $172.60 per 5000 in Barton; $59 in Orleans.

==== Solid waste ====
Barton generated about 2,000 short tons (1,800 t) of waste annually in 2013.

== Transportation ==
=== Major routes ===
The opening of the Interstate north on November 9, 1972, and opening south in 1978, stimulated connections with other communities; it resulted in increased trade and attracted new residents. This was similar to the effects of the opening of the railway a century earlier. In 1980, Barton registered its first population gain in half a century.

Barton has 78.37 miles (126.12 km) of state road and class 1, 2 and 3 roads, of which 44.38 miles (71.42 km) are class 3 (dirt) roads and 21.43 miles (34.49 km) are state roads.

- Interstate 91 – Barton to Derby
- U.S. Route 5 – Barton to Derby
- Vermont Route 16 – Barton to Westmore east and north, to Glover south
- Vermont Route 58 – Barton to Lowell west and Barton to Westmore east

=== Local community public and private transportation ===
Rural Community Transportation provides on-demand rides for medicaid and medicare patients, disabled individuals, and older adults.

=== Railroads ===
While the Washington County Railroad (The Vermont Railway System) runs through Barton about twice a day, it does not make scheduled stops. The railroad created a transload facility in town in 2015. This is operated by a hauler headquartered in Troy.

== Media ==
- The Chronicle – published weekly in Barton
- The Orleans County Monitor was published here from January 8, 1872, to 1953 as a weekly newspaper.

== Culture ==
Barton has two libraries, one in Barton village, and one in Orleans. Barton village contains three areas listed on the National Register of Historic Places.

The Orleans County Fair has been held in the town nearly every August since 1867. It was first held at the site later developed as the Orleans Country Club. It moved to the Barton Fairgrounds, separately owned, in 1868. The fourteenth fair was held in 1903, suggesting skipped years. One year Lowell Thomas, a noted explorer, was the master of ceremonies. In 1912, Theodore Roosevelt campaigned for President here.

For many years, the fair featured harness racing, which was popular in New England. In 2009, a state record for the mile was broken at 1:56.2.

Edward Hoagland wrote an essay, "Americana, etc.", a paean to the Fair of 1969. His praise of girlie shows aroused an uproar among some residents, and resulted in these being shut down as part of the attractions.

The fair continues in the 21st century. In 2011, a Guinness World Record was set when 301 Cadillacs were in the same parade on the opening day of the Fair; they far surpassed the 103 needed to beat the prior record. The Cadillac developer was born in Barton. In 2013, the paid attendance was 18,000.

== Notable people ==
- Frederick W. Baldwin, practiced law with William Grout; president pro tempore of the Vermont Senate (1900)
- Colonel William Barton, Revolutionary War officer, founder of the town
- Susan Dunklee, biathlete, raised in Barton
- Mary Baker Eddy resided with student after the death of her husband in 1882
- Lee E. Emerson, 69th governor of Vermont
- Josiah Grout, 46th governor of Vermont
- William W. Grout, US congressman 1881–1883
- Emory A. Hebard, Vermont State Treasurer (1977–1989)
- Stephen Perry Jocelyn, US Army brigadier general, raised and educated in Barton
- Henry M. Leland, engineer and automotive entrepreneur, created both the Cadillac and Lincoln brands
- Orrin Wiley Locke, state senator from Orleans County
- Willard W. Miles, associate judge on the Vermont Supreme Court
- Major General Francis W. Nye, commander of the Defense Atomic Support Agency, Sandia
- Henry Alexander Stafford, professional baseball player for the New York Giants
- Frank D. Thompson, Associate Justice of the Vermont Supreme Court

== See also ==
- List of municipalities in Vermont
- Conversion of St. Paul Church (Vermont)
