= Runaway Pond =

Marsh in Glover, Vermont, US

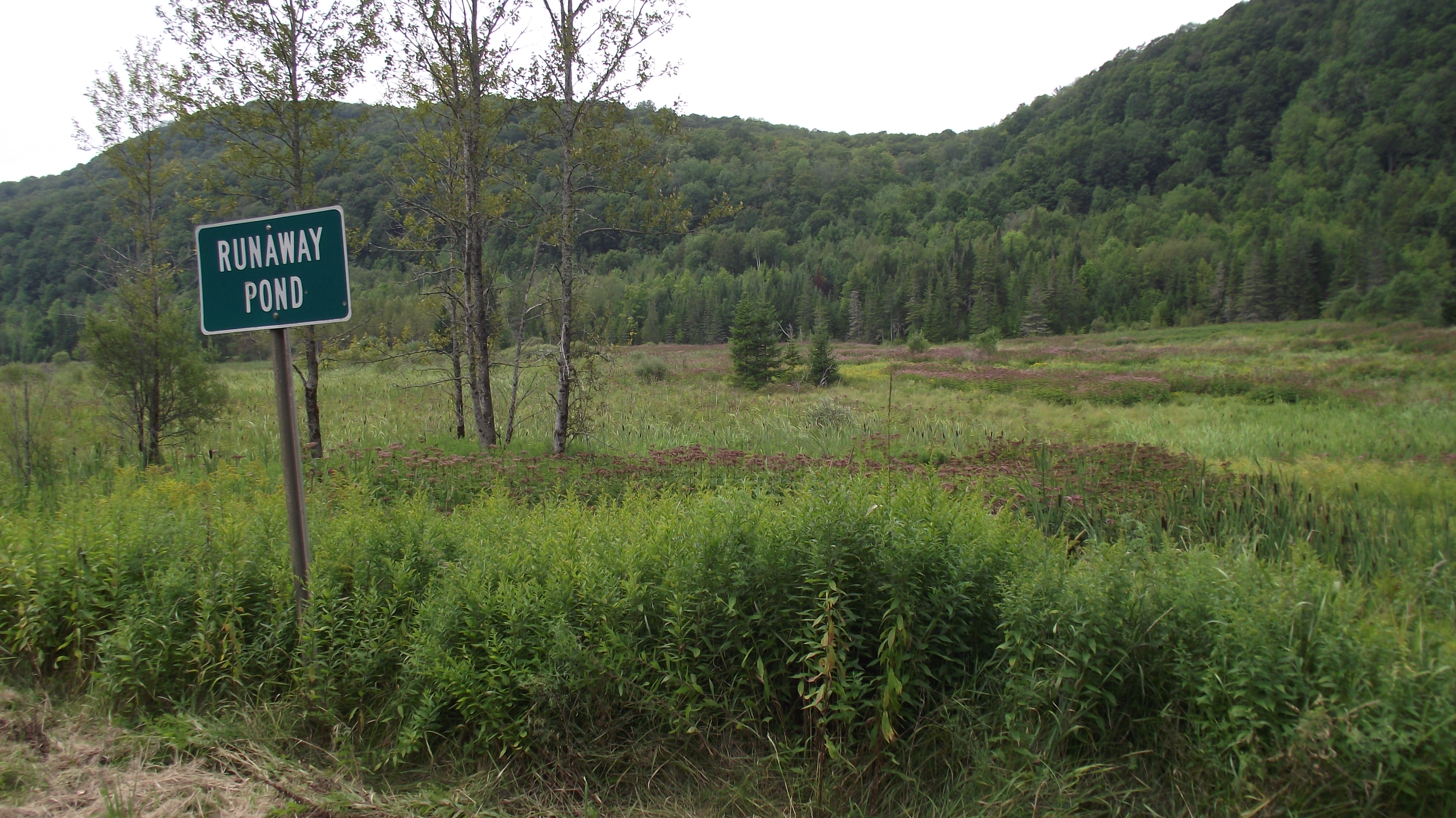
- Site of the "Runaway Pond," Glover, VT

- Location within Vermont
- Location: Glover, Orleans County, Vermont, United States
- Coordinates: 44°38′05″N 72°12′42″W

Runaway Pond is a marsh at the former site of Long Pond in Glover, Vermont. The name arose from an environmental disaster in 1810, when a manual attempt to divert some of the water of Long Pond broke the bank, causing the entire lake to suddenly empty out into the Barton River, uncontrolled.

The site is located 5 miles (8.0 km) south of what is today the central village of Glover.

== Hydrology ==
An engineer estimated that Long Pond must have contained 1,988,000,000 US gallons (7.53×10^{9} L; 1.655×10^{9} imp gal) of water.

It was about 1.5 miles (2.4 km) long, 0.5 miles (0.80 km) wide, and averaged from 80 to 100 feet (24 to 30 m) deep and 150 feet (46 m) deep in the center.

With a surface area of 480 acres, Long Pond exceeded the 100-acre guideline to be considered a lake by today's standards.

== History ==
On June 6, 1810 it was a dry summer and the Barton River, which supplied the power for grist mills in Glover and northward, was running very low. At the request of Arron Willson, the local Glover gristmill owner, 60 men and boys attempted to create a new north outlet from Long Pond to the Barton River, but instead, they unintentionally caused the banks of the pond to give way. This resulted in a flood throughout the Barton River Valley.

The valley drops 600 feet (180 m) from Runaway Pond to Orleans for an average of about 40 feet (12 m) per 1 mile (1.6 km).

The initial surge took trees and huge boulders with it, building up a logjam, which stopped the flood temporarily until the water pressure behind the jam built up, causing a breakthrough. This scenario kept recurring in the flood's progress down to Barton.

One of the laborers, Spencer Chamberlain, ran ahead of the flood just in time to save Arron Willson's wife, working at the mill. There were no deaths.

The water ran out of the pond in 1 hour and 15 minutes, but the mud ran out for hours. The water reached Lake Memphremagog in 4 hours and reportedly raised the level there 1 foot (0.3 m).

The disaster, and the former location of the wayward pond was thereafter called "Runaway Pond."

== Legacy ==
The Runaway Pond is a simple and straightforward example of a disaster to the natural environment inadvertently caused by human activity.

The results of the flood can still be seen today at Clark Pond which is just north of the Runaway Pond site, and elsewhere in the Barton River valley.

Chamberlain's act is commemorated each year on Glover Day (the last Saturday of July) by a 5.5 miles (8.9 km) road race following the path of the flood.

On June 4, 5, and 6, 2010, the Glover Historical Society sponsored a celebration of the Runaway Pond event.
