= Kneecap (disambiguation) =

A kneecap is a leg bone.

Kneecap may also refer to:

- Kneecap (band), Irish band
  - Kneecap (film), an Irish-language film about the band
- NECAP, or the New England Common Assessment Program, pronounced "knee cap"
- Kneecapping, a form of malicious wounding in which the victim is injured in the knee (but rarely injuring the kneecap)
