= Susan Bartlett =

American politician

Member of the Vermont Senate from the Lamoille district
- In office January 1993 – January 2011
- Succeeded by: Richard Westman

Personal details
- Born: December 18, 1946 (age 79) Fall River, Massachusetts
- Party: Democratic
- Spouse: William A.
- Education: University of Vermont, Johnson State College
- Profession: Small business owner

Susan J. Bartlett (born December 18, 1946) is an American politician from the State of Vermont. She was a candidate for the Democratic nomination for Governor of Vermont in 2010 after having served 18 years in the Vermont Senate representing the Lamoille senate district.

Bartlett moved with her parents in 1962 to Orleans, Vermont and graduated in 1964 from Orleans High School. She holds a bachelor's degree from the University of Vermont (1968) and a master's degree in special education administration from SMSU in Johnson, Vermont (1976).

As a small business owner in Stowe, Vermont, Bartlett was elected in 1992 as the first woman and first Democrat to represent Lamoille County in the Vermont Senate. She served on the Appropriations Committee from 1994 to 2011 and was its chair from 2001 onwards. She has previously served on the Economic Development Committee, the Energy and Natural Resources Committee, the Judiciary Committee, the Government Operations Committee and the Agriculture Committee.

On June 4, 2009, Bartlett announced her intention to seek the Democratic nomination for Governor of Vermont in 2010. She placed fifth in the primary election, which was won by Peter Shumlin, receiving about five percent of the vote.

After Shumlin won the general election, Bartlett became Shumlin's Special Assistant, with responsibility for oversight of education and other policy initiatives.

In January 2013 Bartlett moved to the state Agency of Human Services as a Special Projects Coordinator, with the intent to focus on education, employment and antipoverty programs for low-income Vermonters.

She lives in Hyde Park, Vermont with her husband, William.
