= General Nye =

General Nye may refer to:

- Archibald Nye (1895–1967), British Army lieutenant general
- Francis W. Nye (1918–2019), U.S. Air Force major general
- James W. Nye (1815–1876), New York Militia major general
