= Stephen Perry Jocelyn =

U.S. Army brigadier general (1843–1920)

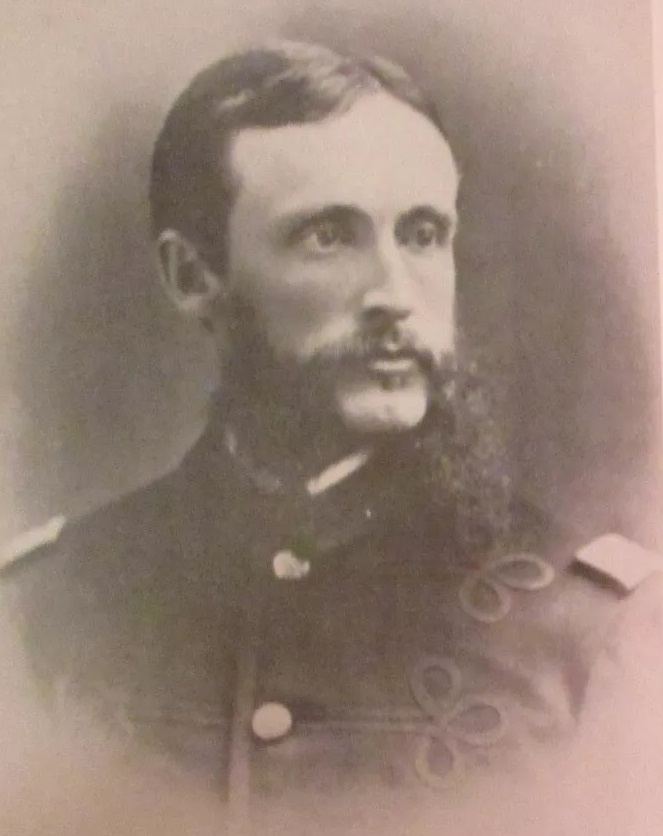
- Jocelyn in 1874. Republished in Mostly Alkali, the 1953 biography of Jocelyn authored by his son.
- Born: March 1, 1843; Brownington, Vermont, US
- Died: March 8, 1920 (aged 77); Burlington, Vermont, US
- Burial place: Arlington National Cemetery
- Spouse: Mary Chamberlin Edgell (m. 1886–1920)
- Children: 3
- Relatives: Peter Westervelt (grandson)
- Military career
- Allegiance: Union (American Civil War); United States
- Service: Union Army (American Civil War); United States Army
- Service years: 1863–1865 (Union Army); 1865–1907 (United States Army)
- Rank: Brigadier General
- Unit: U.S. Army Infantry Branch
- Commands: Company C, 115th U.S. Colored Infantry Regiment; Company E, 115th U.S. Colored Infantry Regiment; Company A, 115th U.S. Colored Infantry Regiment; Company C, 6th Infantry Regiment; Company G, 21st Infantry Regiment; Company B, 21st Infantry Regiment; Chief Mustering Officer of the U.S. Army; 14th Infantry Regiment; U.S. Forces Samar; Department of Visayas; Department of the Columbia
- Wars: American Civil War; Yavapai War; Nez Perce War; Bannock War; Spanish–American War; Philippine–American War

Signature
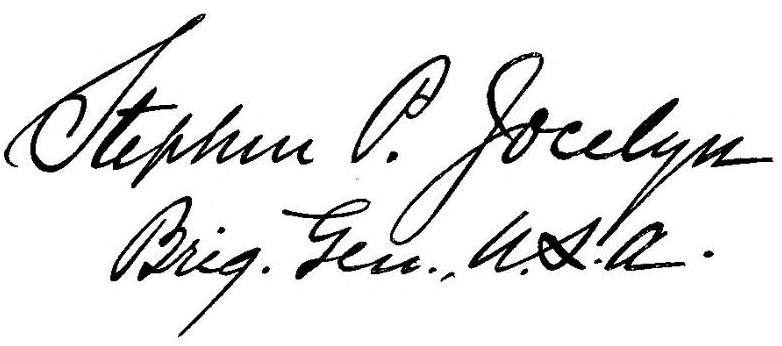

Stephen Perry Jocelyn (1 March 1843 – 8 March 1920) was a career officer in the United States Army. A Union Army veteran of the American Civil War, he also served in the Yavapai War, Nez Perce War, Bannock War, Spanish–American War, and Philippine–American War. Jocelyn attained the rank of brigadier general, and his command assignments included the 14th Infantry Regiment and the Department of the Columbia.

A native of Brownington, Vermont, Jocelyn was raised and educated in Barton and attended Barton Academy in Barton and Peoples Academy in Morrisville. He enlisted in the 6th Vermont Infantry Regiment for the American Civil War and received his commission as a first lieutenant in 1864. Jocelyn remained in the army after the war, and served in command and staff assignments during several American Indian Wars conflicts. He also took part in the Spanish–American War and Philippine–American War. He was promoted to brigadier general in 1906, and commanded the Department of the Columbia until retiring in 1907.

In retirement, Jocelyn was a resident of Burlington, Vermont. He died in Burlington on 8 March 1920 and was buried at Arlington National Cemetery.

== Early life ==
Stephen P. Jocelyn was born in Brownington, Vermont on 1 March 1843, the son of William Joslyn and Abigail Nims (Wilder) Joslyn. (Note: Jocelyn's father spelled the family name "Joslyn"; Jocelyn and his siblings spelled it "Jocelyn".) He was raised and educated in the public schools of Brownington and Barton. Jocelyn continued his education at Brownington Academy and Barton Academy, then attended Morrisville's Peoples Academy in anticipation of enrolling in college.

=== Family ===
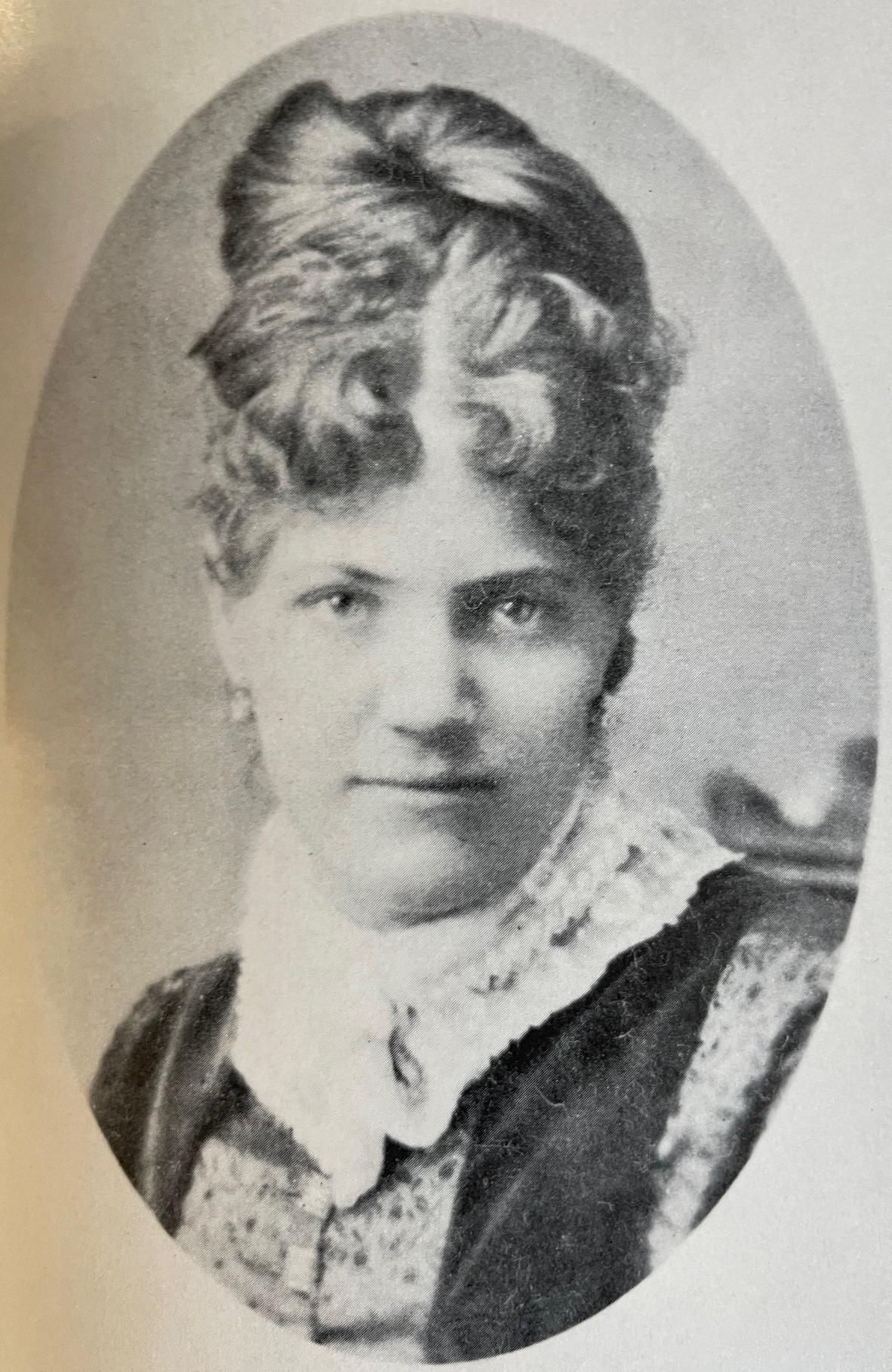
Mary Chamberlain Edgell Jocelyn, c. 1882

In February 1886, Jocelyn married Mary Chamberlin Edgell. They were the parents of three children ― Louise, Dorothy, and Stephen Jr. Louise was the wife of Julian B. Clark, a wealthy Burlington, Vermont heir disabled by polio, whose hobbies included hunting and farming. Dorothy was the wife of William I. Westervelt, a career army officer who attained the rank of brigadier general. Stephen was a 1916 Harvard College graduate and World War I veteran. He later resided in France and authored a 1953 biography of his father, Mostly Alkali.

Peter Westervelt (1919–2015), the son of William I. Westervelt and Dorothy Jocelyn, was a prominent college professor and research scientist.

== Start of career ==
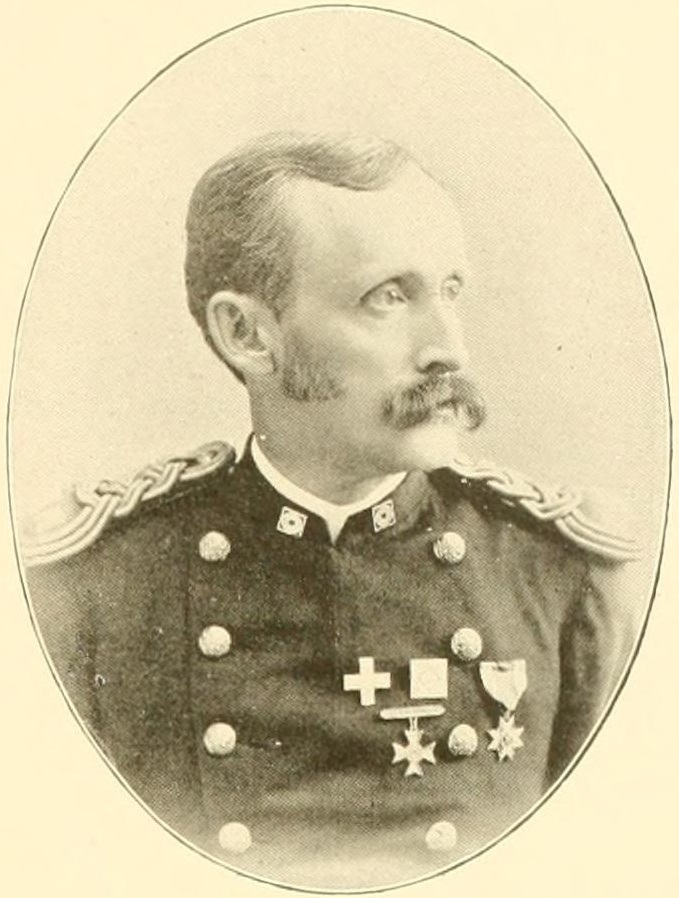
Jocelyn as a captain in 1892

As a teenager, Jocelyn worked at the Barton drugstore owned by his father and a local physician, and was also temporarily employed at drugstores in Brandon and St. Johnsbury. The St. Johnsbury store was also the location of the local telegraph office, and a fellow employee taught Jocelyn telegraphy. After the start of the American Civil War, Jocelyn attempted on several occasions to join the military even though his father was opposed. In October 1862, newspaper articles indicated he had been appointed hospital steward of the 15th Vermont Infantry Regiment, but there are no records to indicate he reported to the regiment or carried out any duties with it. (Note: Mostly Alkali indicates it was the 13th Vermont Infantry.)

In August 1863, Jocelyn decided to join the Union Army rather than accepting a relative's offer to finance his attendance at Dartmouth College. After obtaining his father's consent, he enlisted as a private in Company A, 6th Vermont Infantry Regiment. Assigned as clerk to the mustering officer for Vermont, Jocelyn served at the state's Brattleboro encampment. He was subsequently assigned to the encampment's quartermaster, and supervised several clerks who were responsible for providing uniforms, equipment, food, and pay to newly-arrived recruits.

On the recommendation of Congressman Portus Baxter, in April 1864 he was considered for appointment as an officer; Jocelyn passed the examining board chaired by Colonel Silas Casey, and in August he was commissioned as a first lieutenant in the 115th United States Colored Infantry. The 115th campaigned against pro-Confederate guerillas in Kentucky until December 1864, when it was assigned to the Army of the James. During the regiment's duty in Kentucky, Jocelyn's duties included command of Company C, command of Company E, recruiting officer, and quartermaster officer. The regiment served in Virginia in early 1865, and Jocelyn commanded Company A. He was with the regiment during the Fall of Richmond and post-war occupation of the city. After the war, Jocelyn served with his regiment in Indianola, Texas during occupation duty, and was mustered out of the United States Volunteers in February 1866.

== Continued career ==
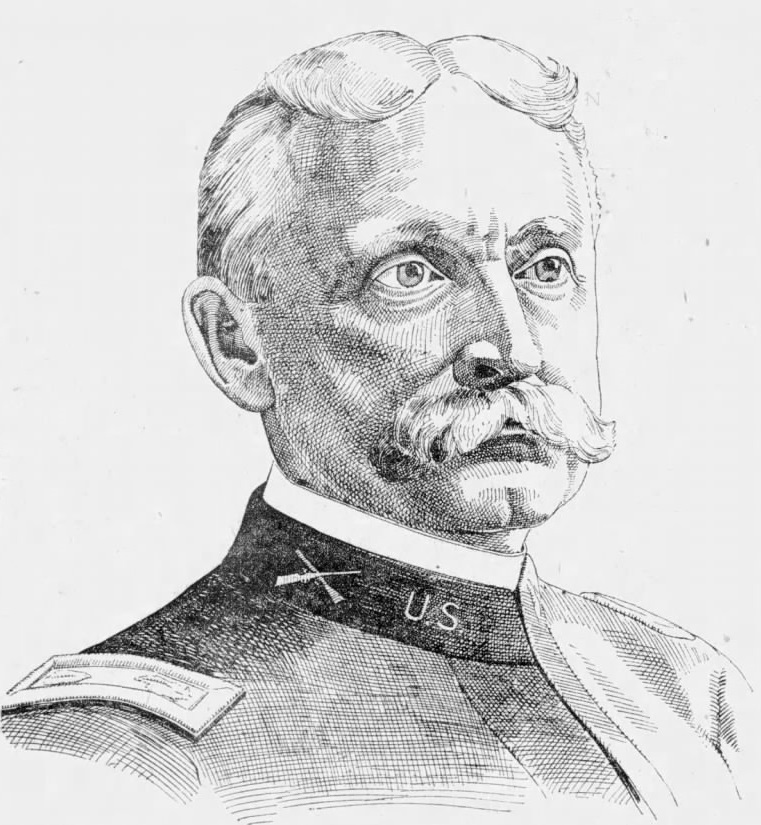
Jocelyn as a lieutenant colonel, c. 1900

After his discharge from the wartime volunteers, Jocelyn was commissioned as a second lieutenant in the regular army's 6th Infantry Regiment. He continued to perform post-war occupation duty during the Reconstruction era, this time in South Carolina, where he commanded the regiment's Company C and served as its quartermaster and adjutant. He was promoted to first lieutenant in July 1866, and beginning in 1867 served with the 6th Infantry at Fort Gibson, Indian Territory. As part of post-war force reductions, Jocelyn was mustered out of the 6th Infantry on 1 January 1871. On 9 March, he returned to duty, this time as a second lieutenant with the 21st Infantry Regiment.

During 1871, Jocelyn served in Arizona Territory, where he took part in the Yavapai War. From 1872 to 1874, he was posted to northern California and southern Oregon, and was stationed at Fort Bidwell, Camp Warner, Fort Klamath. Jocelyn was promoted to first lieutenant on 4 April 1873 and captain on 19 May 1874. In 1875, population increases that followed the development of gold mining that resulted from the 1867 Alaska Purchase led to the U.S. takeover of Fort Stikine, a former British trading post on the panhandle. The fort was christened Fort Wrangel, and Jocelyn commanded the post and the 21st Infantry's Company G until 1877. He participated in the 1877 Nez Perce War and commanded Company B, 21st Infantry during the Battle of the Clearwater and Battle of Camas Creek. He also took part in the 1878 Bannock War, after which he was granted a year-long leave of absence during which he traveled extensively in Europe.

After his 1879 leave of absence, Jocelyn was assigned to duty at Fort Townsend, Washington Territory, where he remained until 1884. During October and November 1881, he commanded an expedition on the Skagit River during tension between Upper Skagit Indian Tribes and white settlers. In 1882, he commanded an expedition that reconnoitered a telegraph route between Port Angeles and Cape Flattery.

During his time in Washington Territory, Jocelyn earned a reputation as an expert in military drill and ceremony, and units under his command won several competitions during the 1880s and 1890s. Beginning in 1884, the 21st Infantry garrisoned a succession of posts in Wyoming, Utah, and Nebraska, and Jocelyn served successively at Fort Fred Steele, Wyoming, Fort Duchesne, Utah, Fort Douglas, Utah, and Fort Sidney, Nebraska. An experienced hunter, Jocelyn developed into an expert marksman; he won several of the army's individual shooting competitions during the 1880s and 1890s. In addition, his regimen for marksmanship training and practice enabled Company B, 21st Infantry to win several team shooting competitions. In February 1890, he received promotion to the brevet rank of major to recognize his gallantry during the Nez Perce War. In the early 1890s, the 21st Infantry was assigned to Fort Niagara and Fort Porter, New York and Jocelyn continued to command Company B at Fort Porter. He remained in command of Company B when it was reassigned to Plattsburgh Barracks, New York. Among the lieutenants who carried out their initial assignments under Jocelyn's command in the 1880s and 1890s were Henry Delp Styer and LaRoy S. Upton, both of whom served as brigadier generals in World War I.

== Later career ==
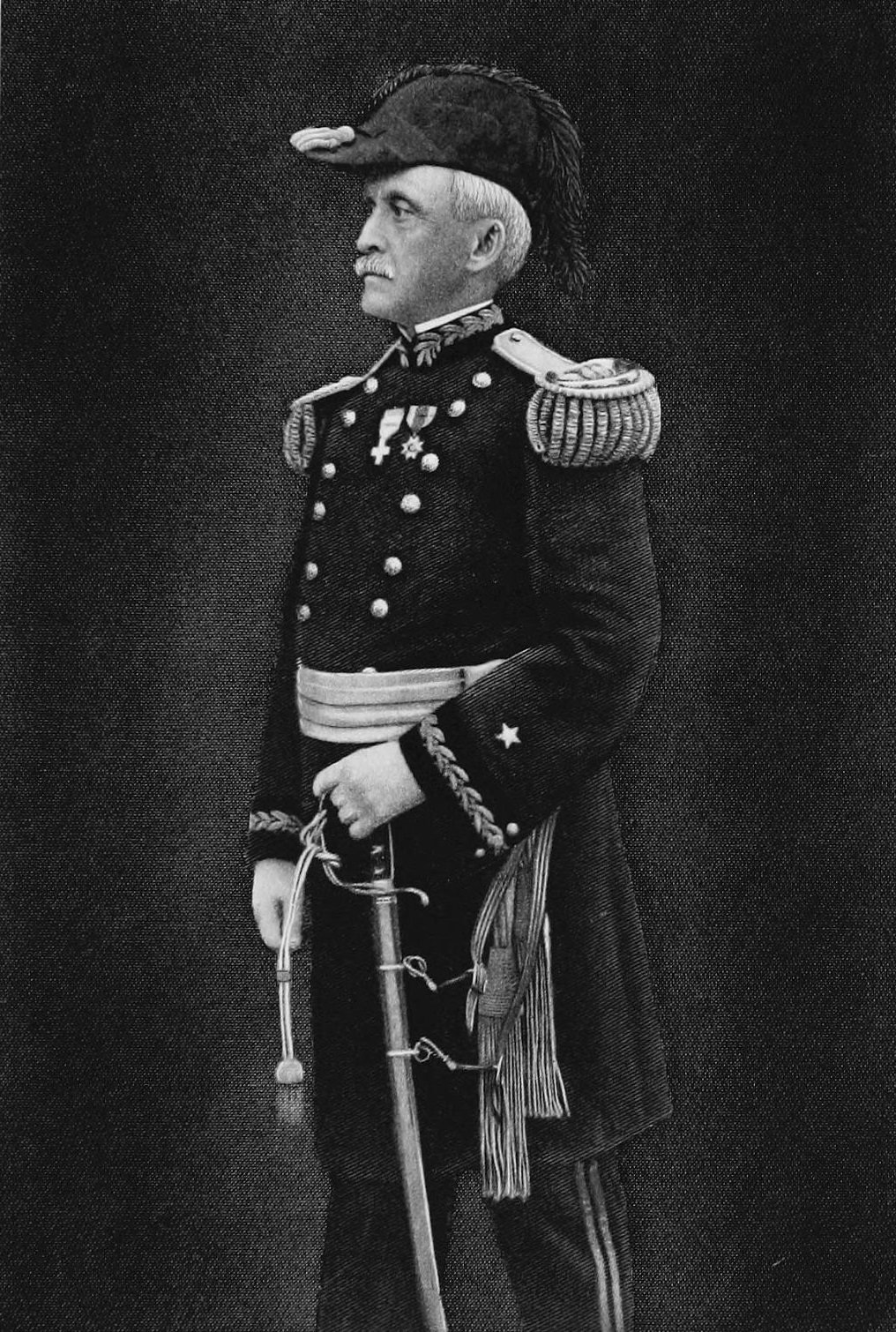
From volume IV (1921) of Vermont: The Green Mountain State

In June 1897, Jocelyn was promoted to major in the 19th Infantry. During the Spanish–American War he was assigned to Fort Ethan Allen, Vermont, where he served beginning in May 1898 as mustering-in officer for the 1st Vermont Infantry Regiment, a unit of United States Volunteers raised for the war. He served as mustering-out officer for the same unit in August 1898, and he was promoted to lieutenant colonel of the 25th Infantry in March 1899. He subsequently performed mustering duty in New York and Kentucky, then was assigned to San Francisco, where he was appointed the army's chief mustering officer. While serving as chief mustering officer, he was assigned to the Philippines during the Philippine–American War, where he visited deployed units to review personnel records in preparation for post-enlistment mustering out.

Jocelyn was promoted to colonel and commander of the 14th Infantry Regiment in February 1901, which he commanded at Fort Snelling, Minnesota, and Fort Wayne, Michigan. He subsequently returned to the Philippines, where he commanded U.S. forces on the island of Samar in 1903, and the Department of Visayas in 1904. In 1904, Jocelyn performed temporary duty as professor of military science at the University of Vermont. From 1904 to 1906, Jocelyn served as chief of staff of the army's Pacific Division, and in this assignment he aided in coordinating the US government's response to the 1906 San Francisco earthquake. He was promoted to brigadier general in June 1906 and from 1906 to 1907, Jocelyn commanded the Department of the Columbia. Having reached the mandatory retirement age of 64, he retired as a brigadier general on 1 March 1907.

In retirement, Jocelyn resided in Burlington, Vermont, where his interests included membership in the Military Order of the Loyal Legion of the United States. He became a member in California in 1884 and he transferred his membership to the Vermont commandery in 1894. After retiring from the army, Jocelyn served as a member of the Vermont commandery's executive council from 1908 to 1909. He was senior vice commander from 1910 to 1911, and commander from 1911 to 1912. Jocelyn maintained an apartment in New York City and traveled extensively, including trips to Mexico, Bermuda, and Canada, in addition to fishing excursions in Florida. In July 1909, Jocelyn served as the grand marshal for the Burlington parade that celebrated the tercentenary of Samuel de Champlain first encountering Lake Champlain. He was a frequent golfer, and played regularly for several years with Crosby P. Miller, a fellow Vermonter and retired brigadier general.

In addition to his MOLLUS membership, Jocelyn's additional interests included membership in the Buffalo Historical Society, General Society of Colonial Wars, and New England Historic Genealogical Society. He was active in the Episcopal Church and belonged to the Army and Navy Club in Washington, D.C., the Army and Navy Club in New York City, the Manila Army and Navy Club, and New York City's Union League Club. He was also a member of the Harrisburg Club in Pennsylvania and the Bohemian Club in San Francisco.

Jocelyn died in Burlington on March 8, 1920. He was buried at Arlington National Cemetery.

== Works by ==
- "Alaskan Notes". Journal of the Military Service Institution of the United States. Vol. XVIII. Governor's Island, New York: Military Service Institution of the United States. 1896. pp. 342–349 – via Google Books.

== Effective dates of rank ==
The dates of rank for Jocelyn's Union Army service were:

- Private, 22 August 1863
- First Lieutenant, 1 August 1864

The dates of rank for Jocelyn's regular army career included:

- Second Lieutenant, 23 February 1866
- First Lieutenant, 21 July 1866
- Second Lieutenant, 9 March 1871
- First Lieutenant, 4 April 1873
- Captain, 19 May 1874
- Brevet Major, 27 February 1890
- Major, 27 June 1897
- Lieutenant Colonel, 31 March 1899
- Colonel, 28 February 1901
- Brigadier General, 16 June 1906
- Brigadier General (Retired), 1 March 1907
