= Conversion of St. Paul Church =

Church building in Barton, Vermont, U.S.

Coordinates: 44.747221°N 72.17487°W

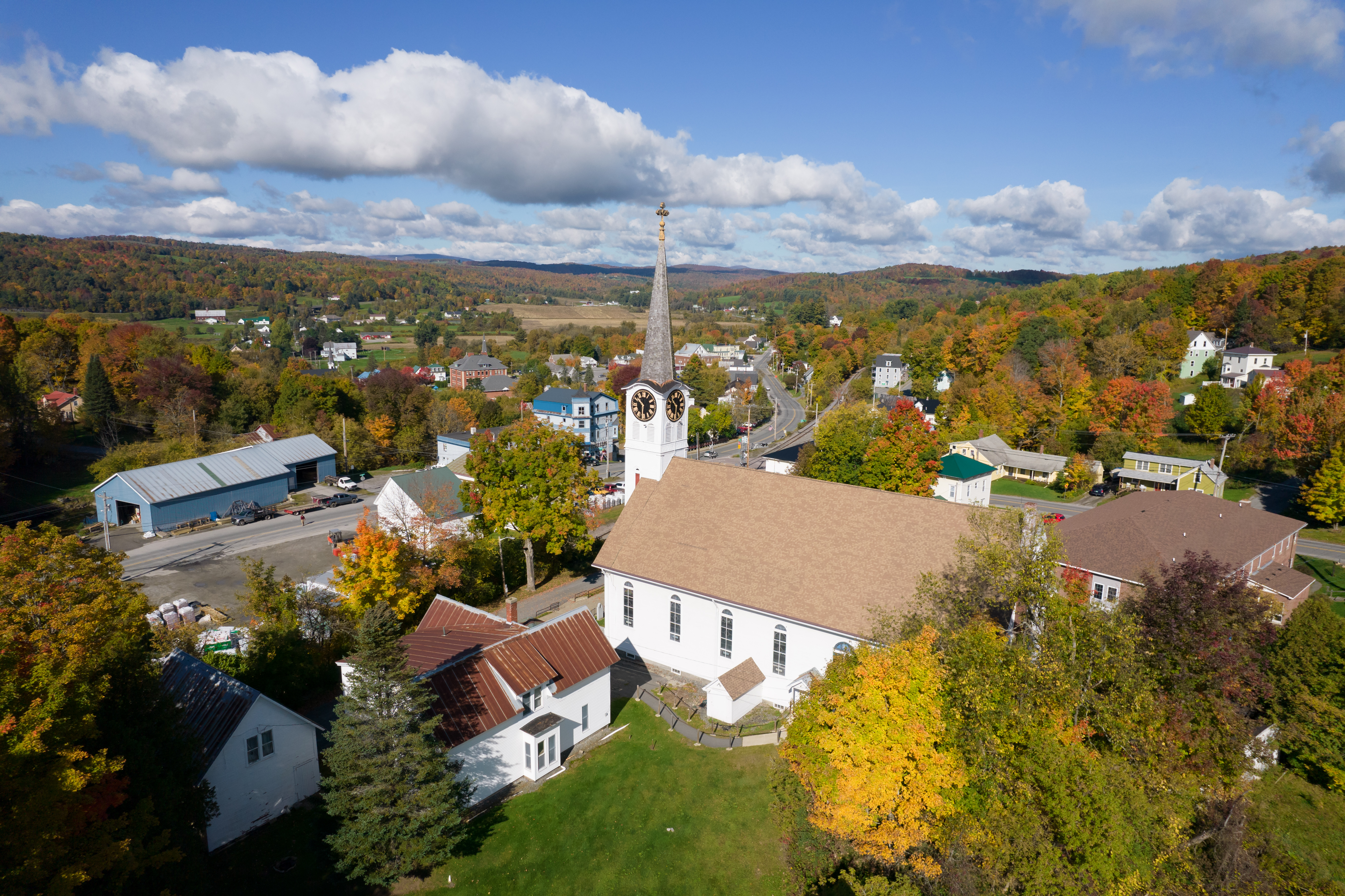
The church in 2021

In 1893 (132 years ago), the Conversion of St. Paul Roman Catholic Church was founded in Barton, Vermont, USA. The parish is under the guidance of the Roman Catholic Diocese of Burlington. The church is usually called St. Paul's by parishioners.

== History ==
Rev. Joseph Turcot was the first resident pastor. He built a new church which was completed on May 24, 1903. Bishop John Michaud blessed the church, whose membership included 60 families and an average Sunday attendance of 300 people.

In 1962, a parishioner erected a statue of Jesus overlooking Crystal Lake.

In 2004, the church was merged into a parish with St. Theresa's in Orleans and St. John Vianney in Irasburg. The reconfigured parish was known as "Trinity Parish."

IN 2006 Fr. Rupp entered a demolition derby as part of fundraising activity to help send parish teachers on a trip to Rome. A clip of the race was televised throughout the state on the evening news.

=== Missions and missionaries ===
The first Mass was said in Barton in 1851. After 1854, priests from Stanstead and St. Johnsbury alternated saying mass in the area.

Barton was a mission church of Newport after their parish was established in 1873. Mass was said in the Barton Academy hall until 1878. The parish bought a church from the Congregationalists who had built a new one. Because the church had been converted to Catholic use, the official name the "Conversion of St. Paul" was thought appropriate.

Just before their first priest arrived, the railroad came through. The company moved the church to East Street.

The parish's first priest also said mass in Greensboro Bend twice a month for several years.

From 1918-2005, the pastor was mission pastor for St. John of the Cross in East Albany.

About 2002, the parish priest became responsible for two more parishes, St. Teresa's in Orleans and St. John Vianney in Irasburg.

== The school ==
Fr. Turcot established the parochial elementary school. The school opened in 1896 in a private home on May Pond Road.

In 1896, the parish purchased an old store building to use as a school. This was moved near the church.

Fr. Eugene Leblanc contracted with the Sisters of the Assumption of the Blessed Virgin Mary of Nicolet, Quebec to teach at the parochial school in 1907. Sister St. Benjamin arrived with three other nuns. School population was around 100 until 1917 when a fire destroyed the tub factory, forcing their employees to move elsewhere for work. The number of pupils plummeted to 55.

As French was the native language of the teaching nuns, and often, the mother tongue of the students, teaching French was often a major part of the curricula. In 1945, more time was devoted to English, then dropped entirely. In 1987, the school again taught French.

The parish built a new school and convent in the 1950s. In 1960, there was a record 194 students.

In 1991, the Sisters of the Assumption withdrew from the school.

Enrollment in 1995, totaled 99.

In 1997, the diocese notified the school that it would cease subsidizing it and it would close its doors at the end of the school year. This was coincident with the withdrawal of the nuns that had taught there for ninety years. The congregation's support prevented this planned closing.

Peter Close became principal in 2004. As of 2016 Joanne Beloin was principal.

Tuition for Catholics in 2006 was $1,350 to $2,000, which was the lowest tuition for any Catholic school in New England.

In 2008, the school was accredited by the New England Association of Schools and Colleges.

In 2010, authorized by the state to do so, the public Orleans Central Supervisory Union furnished an interventionist, part-time, at the school.

== Pastors ==
Pastors had assistant priests from about 1922-1970 (est.)

Pastors of St. Paul

1. Father Joseph Turcot 1893-1906
2. Father Joseph Eugene LaBlanc 1906 - 1913
3. Father Louis Marceau 1913-1922
4. Father Edmund Marion 1923-1939
5. Father Alfred Desaults 1939-1947
6. Father Wilfrid A. Gelineau 1947-1956
7. Father William LaLiberte 1956-1974, the longest serving pastor
8. Father Oliver Fournier 1974-1975
9. Father Phil Lamothe 1975-1979
10. Father Norman Nadeau 1979-1985
11. Father Michael Madden 1985-1988
12. Father Maurice Roy 1988-1992
13. Father James Mattison 1992-1997
14. Father Patrick Foreman 1997-2002
15. Father Daniel Rupp 2002–2008
16. Father Sixmund Nyabenda 2008-2011
17. Father Timothy Naples 2011-2019
18. Father Curtis Miller 2019-2024
19. Father Robert Murphy 2024-2025
20. Father Gregory Caldwell 2025-current
