= Peoples Academy =

- Peoples Academy--Copley Building, Grout Observatory and Community Bandshell
- U.S. National Register of Historic Places
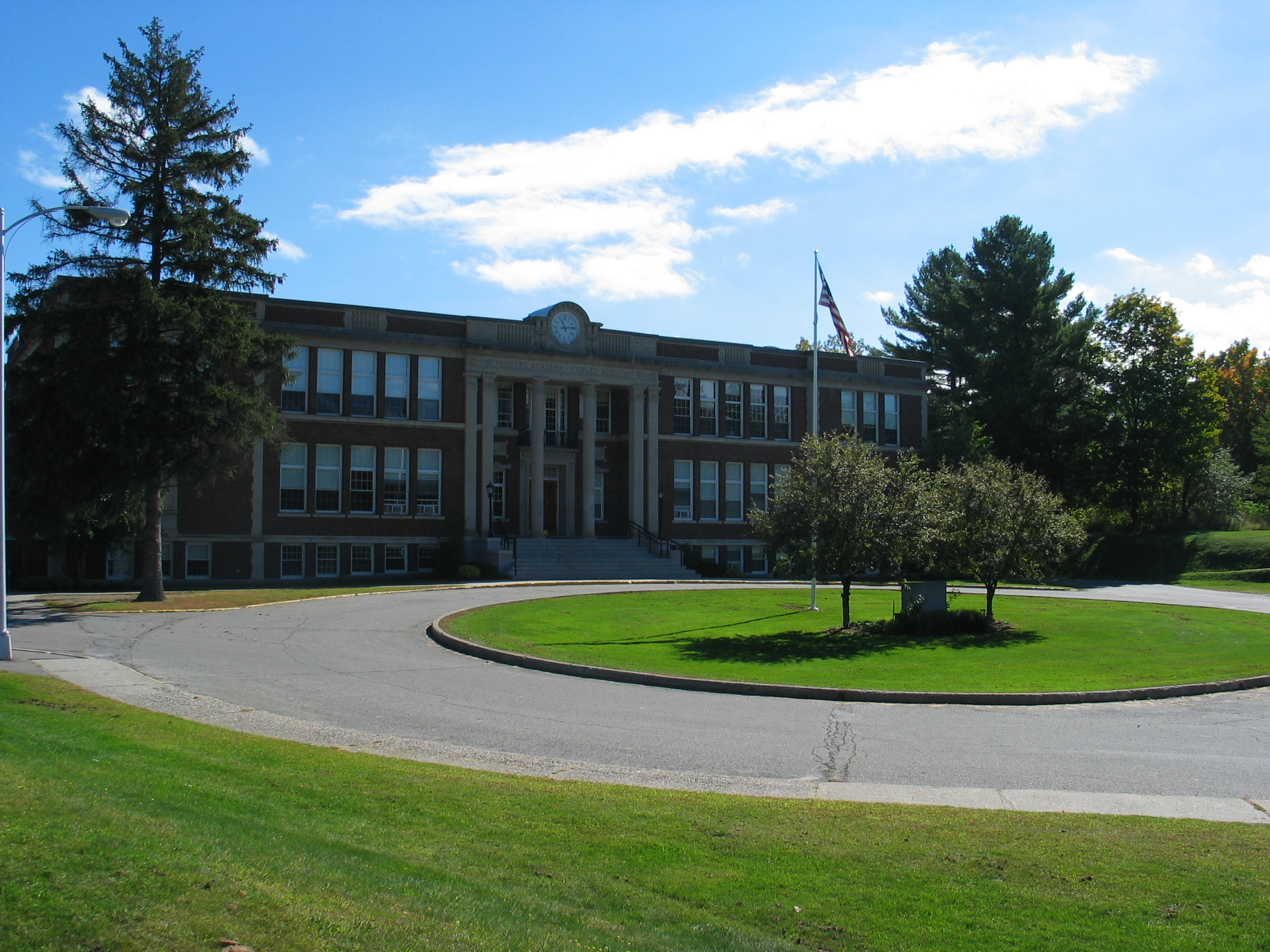

- Location within Vermont Location within the United States
- Location: 202 Copley Ave., Morristown, Vermont
- Coordinates: 44.5624°N 72.5904°W
- Area: 15.5 acres (6.3 ha)
- Built: 1927
- Architectural style: Classical Revival
- MPS: Educational Resources of Vermont MPS
- NRHP reference No.: 96000255
- Added to NRHP: March 7, 1996

The Peoples Academy is a historic high school in Morrisville, Vermont.

In 1996, the main school building, along with the observatory and bandshell located on the school grounds, was listed on the National Register of Historic Places. All of the structures are bequests of George C. Grout and native son Alexander Hamilton Copley. The latter donated both the land and building that form the Peoples Academy, which serves as the local public high school and is a major local work of Classical Revival architecture. Since 2007, Philip Grant has been the school's principal.

== Description and history ==
The Peoples Academy complex is located at the eastern end of Main Street, on a hill that provides a commanding view of the village of Morrisville to the west. The main block of the school is a two-story red brick building, with a flat roof and limestone trim. The broad facade is divided into five sections, and is roughly symmetrical. The outer sections project slightly, and have three window bays and quoined corners; the ground floor level has no windows, and a single round-arch stone panel at the center. The next sections in from the sides each have five window bays. The center section houses the main entrance at its center, with flanking single windows on the ground floor, and doubled window bays in the upper level. The section is flanked by paired square pilasters, and the entrance bay is framed by Corinthian columns. The section is topped by a balustrade with an embedded clock.

The main block has had a number of more modern additions made over the 20th century. The building complex also includes a circular brick astronomical observatory building, donated by George C. Grout in 1930, and the Community Bandshell, a wood-frame structure that has traditionally been used for school graduation ceremonies since its construction in 1930.

The property and initial building for the Peoples Academy were made by a donation by Alexander Hamilton Copley, a Lamoille County native who had made a fortune as a pharmaceutical businessman in Boston, Massachusetts. He originally purchased the land to build a house for himself and his wife, but she got sick and died before this vision was realized. He instead gave the property to the town, and funded construction of the building, which is nearly identical to a period high school building in Provincetown, Massachusetts.

== Notable alumni ==
- Stephen Perry Jocelyn, US Army brigadier general

== See also ==
- National Register of Historic Places listings in Lamoille County, Vermont
