= Orleans High School (Vermont) =

Coordinates: 44.81007°N 72.19686°W

Location
- 53 School Street; Orleans, Orleans County, Vermont; United States

Information
- Established: 1901
- Closed: 1967
- Grades: 9-12
- Enrollment: c.150 (1953)
- Colors: Red and White
- Mascot: Red Rapiers

Orleans High School was a school in Orleans, Vermont. It functioned as both a high school and middle school to the village of Orleans and surrounding towns for nearly half a century. The high school was replaced by the Lake Region Union High School on September 11, 1967. Orleans alumni continue to meet annually. They fund scholarships for descendants of graduates.

The building today is used to educate elementary students from the village.

== History ==
Orleans graduated its first class in 1901 from a wooden two-story building where the Federated Church now stands on School Street. While that school was differed in name and location from the eventual brick structure on School Street, its graduates were recognized as part of a continuous alumni for attendees. Forty students graduated from 1901-1910.

In 1914, 35 students were attending the high school out of a total for the system of 232. The purpose of all high schools of that time was to prepare scholars for college. To improve attendance and the overall efficiency of the system as per the High school movement, the school began to offer Agriculture, Home Economics, and Commercial.

The final structure was opened in March 1923. The old building became the elementary school, but it continued to house the Agriculture and Industrial Arts programs, as well as the Superintendent's office, for the town of Barton. When the regional high school opened in 1967, the elementary school moved to the vacated high school building. The old elementary school building was later sold and razed and the Federated Church was built on the site. The old high school did not have a regulation-sized gymnasium. This was not prejudicial to its use until the 1950s. After that time, The boys' and girls' basketball teams practiced there, but hosted home games at other locations. For many years, OHS' "home court" was at Derby High School.

In 1928, there were seven faculty members. This had increased to 13 by 1967. Until the regional high school opened, the principals were all expected to teach several classes, as well as to be the school's guidance counselor.

Besides the village of Orleans, the following towns sent their children to be educated there: Albany, Irasburg, Coventry, Brownington, and Charleston.

The first Vermont Science Fair was held at the school in 1950. An Orleans student won and went on to represent the state at the New England Fair that year.

From 1910 to 1967, 1,358 students graduated. Total for 1901–1957 was 1,398.

== Recognition ==
There were girls and boys basketball teams at the beginning of the 20th century, as well as baseball for boys. Basketball was the only girls sport. In the late 1950s both boys and girls played soccer. In the 1960s golf arrived for boys.

- Boys basketball, Rutland Rotary Tournament champions 1928
- Boys basketball Vermont Junior tournament champions 1933 This team won the overall state championship two weeks later, the only small school to have ever achieved this. A St. Johnsbury sportswriter dubbed the team the "Red Rapiers" which was thereafter used as the school mascot.
- Unmarked baseball trophy 1930s?
- Unmarked trophy from Headmasters club 1935
- Boys basketball Junior Tournament champion. Headmasters club. No year (about 1935)
- Girls Basketball Champions, Conference B 1958
- Boys basketball champions, Class I 1959
- NBL soccer champions 1965
- State Golf Champions 1964, 1965, and 1966

A basketball coach at OHS from 1961 onwards, as well as at other schools, Dick Jarvis was inducted into the Vermont Coaches Basketball Hall of Fame.

== Principals ==
1. Charles S. Rising 1928?-1945?
2. Rolfe Schoppe 1940?-1953
3. Dustin White – 1953–1957
4. Wayne O. Stacy – 1957–1963
5. Joe Brennan 1963–1967

== Notable alumni ==
- Susan J. Barlett – State Senator, Lamoille County 1993–2004 (maiden name Susan Walker, class of 1964.)
- Nancy Hall Sheltra 1966 – Representative, Vermont Legislature 1989–2004
- Kermit Smith 1946. Sergeant-at-Arms, Vermont Legislature 1988–1993
- Henry Alexander Stafford 1910, professional baseball player for the New York Giants

=== Notable teachers ===
- Howard Frank Mosher taught from the mid-1960s through the school closure.

== Additional information ==
- The mascot was the "Red Rapiers"
- School colors were red and white.
- School newspaper was the Hourglass
- Its main rival was cross-town Barton Academy
- Howard Frank Mosher, author, taught English here during the school's final years.
