= Barton Academy (Vermont) =

Coordinates: 44.74924°N 72.18021°W

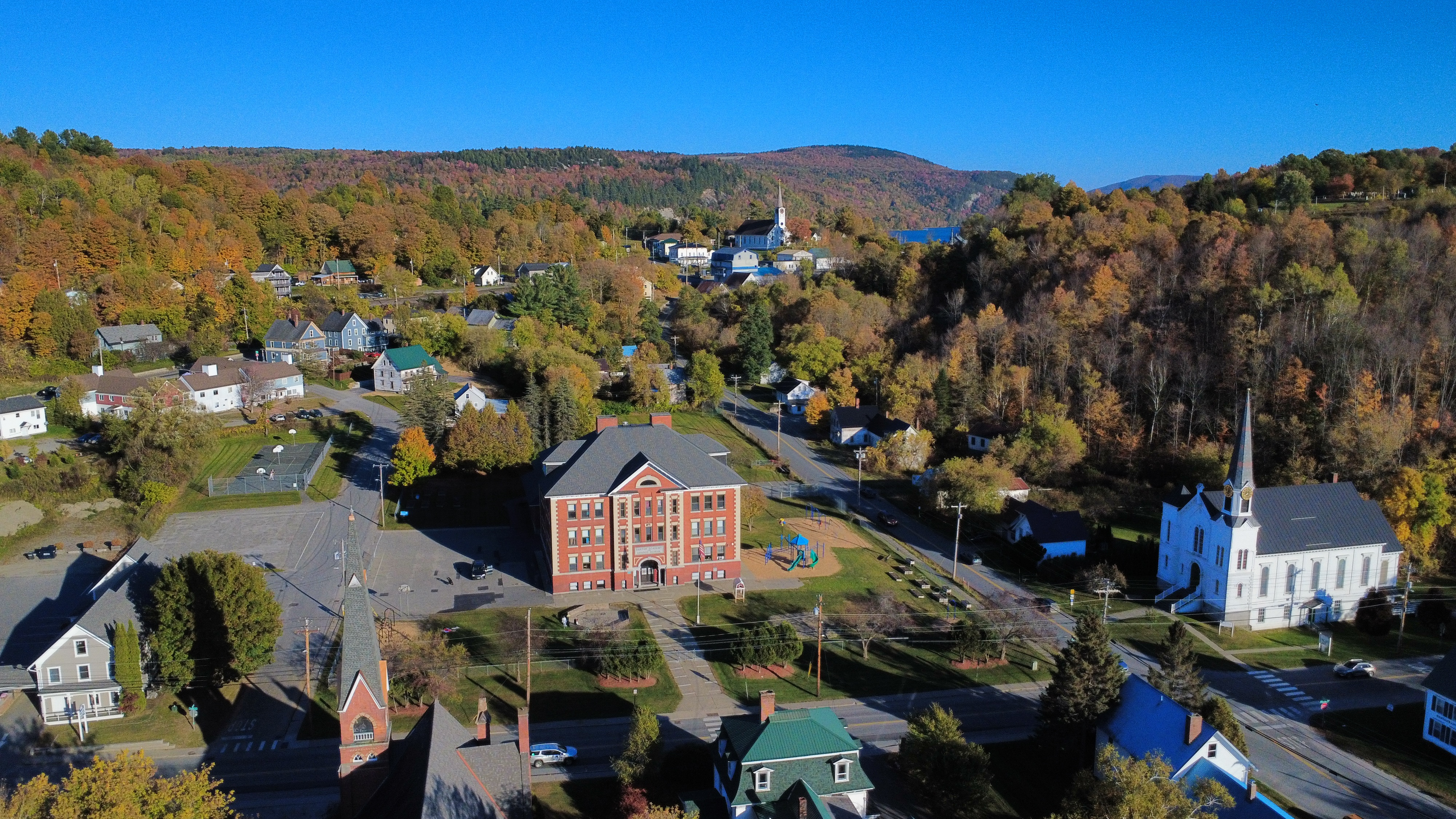

Location
- 137 Church Street; Barton, Vermont

Information
- School type: Public high school
- Founded: 1852
- Closed: 1967
- Principal: Benjamin Hinman Steele (founding); Raymond Mason (last)
- Colors: Orange and Black
- Nickname: BA

Barton Academy was a high school in the town of Barton, Vermont and also served surrounding towns for over a century. The Academy was replaced by the Lake Region Union High School on September 11, 1967. Alumni continue to meet annually, and also fund scholarships for graduates of Lake Region. The building also housed the town's grammar school.

== History ==
The Academy started in the fall of 1852 in a building on the location now occupied by the school parking lot. There is an early list of students who were enrolled. It was chartered by the legislature in 1854.

A listing of graduates from 1926, lists the first class as 1886.

The cornerstone of the current building is marked "1907." The project was the biggest building project the town had ever seen. It cost $42,000. An Indian burial ground was discovered during the excavation. There is no record of what happened to those artifacts. The former school was moved across the street in 1909 and later used as a gymnasium and cafeteria. It was torn down in 1980.

In the early 1900s, Barton Academy ranked eighth among all high schools, public and private, in Vermont.

The Academy closed in 1967, replaced by the Lake Region Union High School. The former building, with the name "Barton Academy and Graded School" carved on a 4.5 short tons (4.1 t) granite slab over the entryway, is used as an elementary school.

An addition was completed in 1979.

== Architecture ==
Architectural historians Glenn Andres and Curtis Johnson commented that the school had a "finely proportioned central pavilion with quoins and a broken pediment, and a Palladian porch that screens a recessed entrance" and "There is a finesse and logic to the composition that makes this village school more than a pastiche of derivative details, perhaps indicative of industrial Barton's commercial ties to major centers of taste."

== Principals ==
1. Benjamin Hinman Steele, briefly when he was 20 in 1853 or so, a young graduate of Dartmouth and simultaneously studying for the law at the same time! Went on to become a judge on the Vermont Supreme Court and died at the age of 37
2. George W. Quimby - about 1859 to 1862. Captain in Civil War, 4th Vermont Infantry, Company D. Killed December 13, 1862, at the Battle of Fredericksburg
3. Emilie M. Gleason - June 1877

Other principals of Barton Academy
1. Ernest C. Benjamin - 1880
2. C.H. Willey - March 1893
3. Harry J. Stannard - 1893-1914
4. F. Jay Bates 1915-?
5. Mr. Meacham - 1924-26
6. Cedric Pierce - 1931-1948
7. David Shipp 1948–1952
8. George MacKenzie 1952-1958+
9. Cedric Pierce (a second time) 1961-1963
10. Rev. William Chadwick 1963-1966
11. Raymond Mason 1966-1967

== Athletics ==
The Academy fielded Basketball Teams for both boys and girls and a boys baseball team. It fielded a soccer team beginning about 1958. School colors were orange and black. The mascot was the Yellow Peril. The school's main rival was cross-town Orleans High School.

=== Recognition ===
- State Class C Champions, Baseball 1951

== Notable graduates ==
- Lee E. Emerson (1917), Governor of Vermont
- Stephen Perry Jocelyn (1861), US Army brigadier general
- Francis W. Nye (1936), Major General commanding the Sandia, NM Atomic Laboratory
