= George Conrad Westervelt =

19/20th-century U.S. Navy engineer and cofounder of Boeing

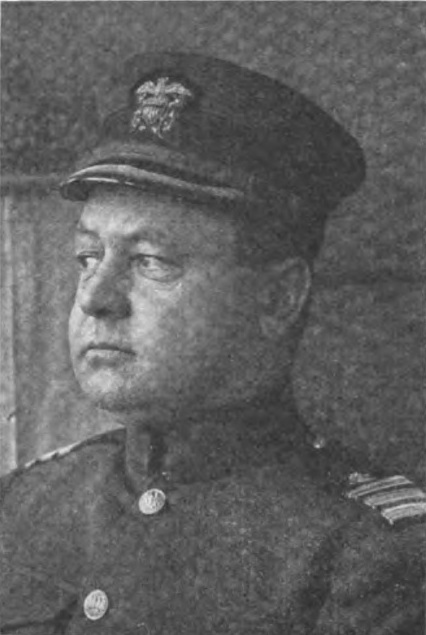
- Cmdr. G. C. Westervelt
- Born: December 30, 1879; Corpus Christi, Texas, US
- Died: March 15, 1956 (aged 76); Florida, US
- Burial place: Arlington National Cemetery
- Education: Texas Military Institute, San Antonio, Texas, now TMI Episcopal School of Texas; United States Naval Academy
- Alma mater: Massachusetts Institute of Technology; United States Naval Academy
- Occupations: naval engineering, aircraft executive, corporate troubleshooter
- Known for: Aircraft industry
- Title: Co-Founder of Boeing Company
- Spouse: Rieta Brabham Langhorne (m. 1927; died 1956)
- Children: 2
- Military career
- Allegiance: United States
- Branch: United States Navy
- Service years: 1901–1927; 1942–1943
- Rank: Captain
- Nickname: Scrappy
- Commands: Naval Aircraft Factory
- Conflicts: World War I World War II

George Conrad Westervelt (December 30, 1879 – March 15, 1956) was a U.S. Navy engineer who created the company "Pacific Aero Products Co." together with William Boeing. Westervelt left the company in 1916 and Boeing changed the name of the company to the Boeing Airplane Company the following year.

== Early life ==
George Conrad Westervelt was born in Corpus Christi, Texas to GW Westervelt and Ida Florence DeRyee (DuRy) Westervelt. He attended Corpus Christi Grammar School and Texas Military Institute, San Antonio, Texas.

== Naval career ==
Westervelt was a 1901 graduate of the United States Naval Academy and a 1908 graduate of the Massachusetts Institute of Technology in naval architecture and marine engineering. Until 1916, Westervelt was stationed on the west coast of the United States. In 1916, he was transferred to the east coast and headed the Naval Aircraft Factory in Philadelphia from 1921 to 1927. Westervelt retired from the USN with the rank of Captain.

== Aviation career ==
During his naval career, Westervelt was also involved in naval aviation. Westervelt became friends with Boeing and worked with him on seaplanes, co-designing the Boeing Model 1, and co-founded The Boeing Company. He left Pacific Aero Products after 1916 after being transferred to the east coast by the USN. Westervelt was assigned by the Navy Bureau of Construction and Repair to work with Curtiss Aeroplane and Motor Company on the Curtiss NC float plane and later became vice-president with Curtiss-Wright following his retirement from the USN. From 1930 to 1931 Westervelt went to China to help out with the China National Aviation Corporation.

During World War II, Westervelt was called back to active duty in April 1942 to manage military aircraft production by the Brewster Aeronautical Corporation until Henry J. Kaiser took over in 1943.

== Personal life ==
Westervelt married Rieta Brabham Langhorne of Lynchburg, Virginia, on December 20, 1927, and had two daughters, Sally Cary and Effie Eda. He retired from Curtiss-Wright and became chairman of the board of the Kentucky River Coal Corporation. Westervelt died in 1956 in Florida, where he had a winter home at Jupiter Island and a ranch near Stuart, Florida.

Among Westervelt's family members were his brother William I. Westervelt, a US Army brigadier general, and his nephew Peter Westervelt, a prominent college professor and physicist.

Westervelt was buried with military honors at Arlington National Cemetery.
