= William I. Westervelt =

American military officer (1876–1960)

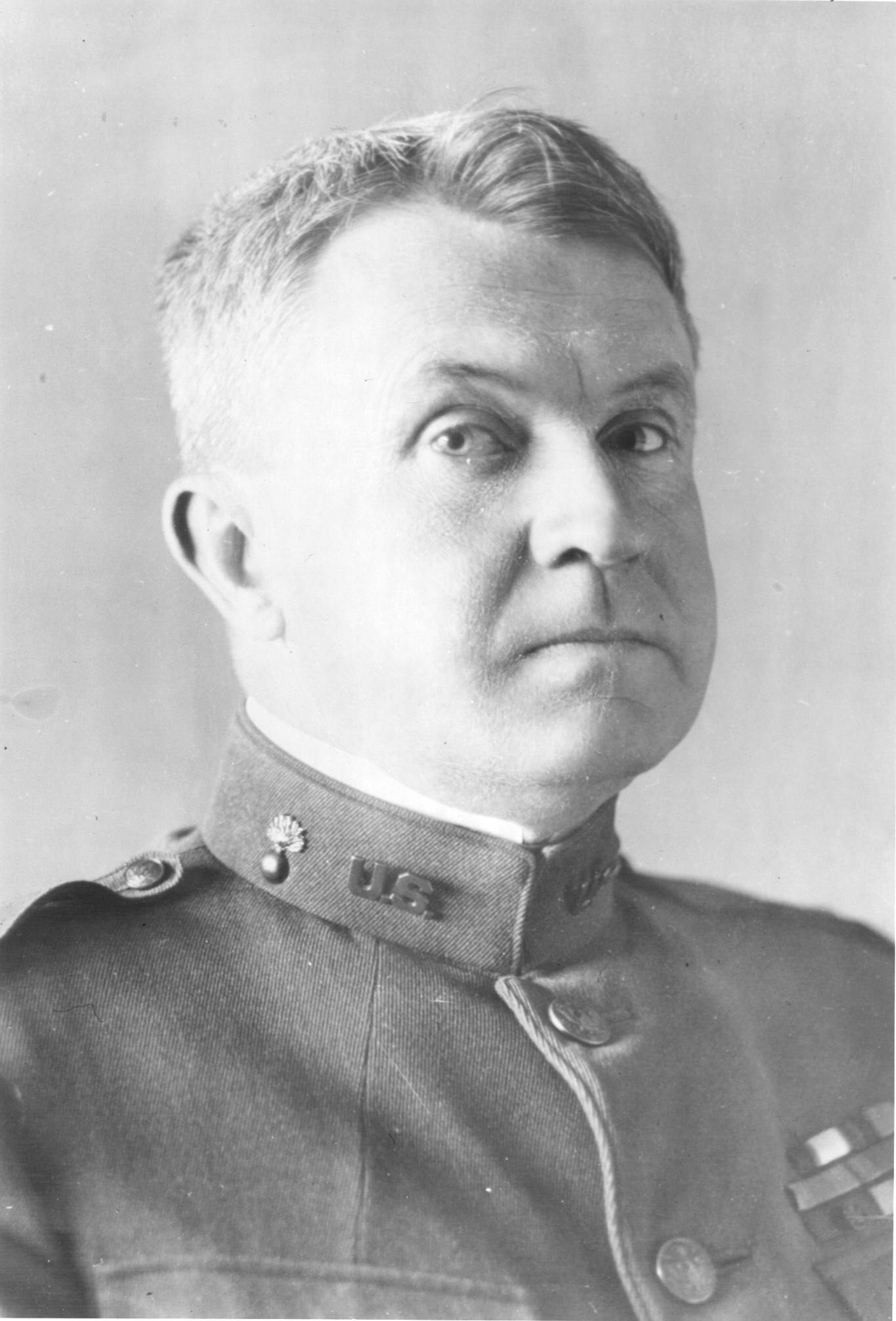
- Westervelt as a lieutenant colonel in 1921
- Born: September 11, 1876; Corpus Christi, Texas, US
- Died: March 1, 1960 (aged 83); Brattleboro, Vermont, US
- Burial place: Cimetière Mont-Royal, Outremont, Montreal, Canada
- Alma mater: United States Military Academy
- Spouse: Dorothy Jocelyn (m. 1918–1960)
- Children: 3 (including Peter Westervelt)
- Relatives: George Conrad Westervelt (brother); Stephen Perry Jocelyn (father-in-law)
- Military career
- Service: United States Army
- Service years: 1900–1928; 1940
- Rank: Brigadier General
- Service number: 0-1093
- Units: US Army Field Artillery Branch; US Army Ordnance Corps
- Commands: Gun Factory, Watervliet Arsenal; Materiel Section, First Army Artillery; US Army Caliber Board; Watervliet Arsenal; U.S. Military Attaché to France
- Wars: Philippine–American War; Mexican Border War; World War I World War II
- Awards: Army Distinguished Service Medal
- Other work: Director of Research Laboratories, Sears, Roebuck and Co.

William I. Westervelt (11 September 1876 – 1 March 1960) was a career officer in the United States Army. A 1900 graduate of the United States Military Academy, he was a veteran of the Philippine–American War, Mexican Border War, and World War I. A specialist in the design and manufacture of artillery pieces and ammunition, he attained the rank of temporary brigadier general. During the First World War, Westervelt served as adjutant of the 1st Artillery Brigade, then served as chief of the Materiel Section on the staff of the American Expeditionary Forces (AEF). He briefly commanded First Army Artillery, then was assigned as assistant to the Chief of AEF Artillery with the temporary rank of brigadier general. Westervelt's wartime service was recognized with award of the Army Distinguished Service Medal and several foreign decorations.

After the war, Westervelt was president of an army board that studied artillery manufacture in Germany, Italy, and other European countries, then recommended improvements to the US Army's processes. His post-war assignments included command of the Watervliet Arsenal. Westervelt retired as a lieutenant colonel in 1927, but in 1930 Congress passed legislation permitting World War I general officers to retire at their highest rank, and he was promoted to brigadier general on the retired list. After retiring, Westervelt was Director of Research Laboratories for Sears, Roebuck and Co. in Chicago. He later moved to New York City, where he was a consultant for and a director of the Ross & Company engineering firm and a director of several other companies.

During World War II, Westervelt was recalled to active duty and assigned to staff duty in the office of the army's Chief of Ordnance. He was later appointed to several civilian government posts concerned with wartime manufacturing. In 1951, Westervelt's health began to fail, and he moved to Burlington, Vermont so he could live near family. He died at the Brattleboro Retreat on 1 March 1960 and was buried at Cimetière Mont-Royal in the Outremont borough of Montreal.

== Early life ==
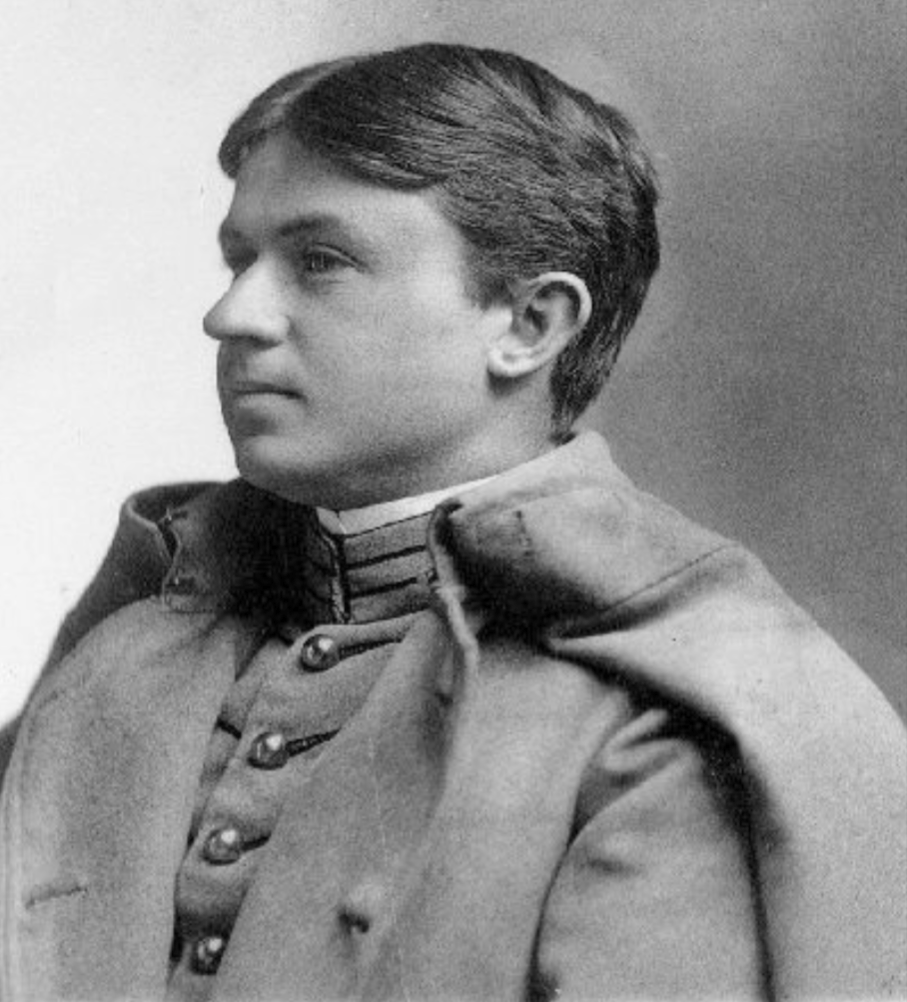
Westervelt as a West Point senior in 1900

William Irving Westervelt was born in Corpus Christi, Texas on 11 September 1876, a son of George William Westervelt and Ida (deRyee) Westervelt. Among his siblings was George Conrad Westervelt, a prominent United States Navy officer and aviation pioneer. Westervelt was raised and educated in Corpus Christi, and graduated from Corpus Christi High School in 1894.

In 1895, Westervelt obtained an appointment to the United States Military Academy at West Point. He attended from 1896 to 1900 and graduated ranked 16th of 54. Among his classmates who also became general officers were Robert E. Wood, Archibald H. Sunderland, and Augustine McIntyre Jr. Westervelt received his commission as a second lieutenant of Field Artillery and was assigned to the 1st Artillery Regiment.

== Start of career ==
Westervelt joined his regiment Fort Sam Houston and was assigned to Light Battery K. He was subsequently assigned to duty in the Philippines during the Philippine–American War, and he was promoted to first lieutenant in July 1901. From August 1904 to September 1906, Westervelt was posted to West Point as an instructor in the Philosophy Department. In September 1906, he was promoted to temporary captain in the Ordnance Corps and was assigned to experiment with Field Artillery at Sandy Hook Proving Ground, New Jersey. In September 1906, he was appointed inspector of Ordnance at Philadelphia's Midvale Steel Works, followed by assignment as assistant to the commanding officer of the Rock Island Arsenal. He was promoted to permanent captain in June 1907.

From July 1908 to October 1910, Westervelt was assigned to field artillery production and inspection duties at Philadelphia's Frankford Arsenal. In July 1910, he was transferred from the 1st Artillery to the 5th Field Artillery. From October 1910 to August 1911, Westervelt served on the Field Artillery Board, an army panel that researched Field Artillery weapons and equipment and made procurement recommendations. From August 1911 to December 1912, he was adjutant of the 5th Field Artillery. In June 1913 he was transferred to the 2nd Field Artillery, and he served in the Philippines from June to November. In November 1913, he was promoted to temporary major in the Ordnance Corps.

== Continued career ==
Beginning in November 1913, Westervelt performed Ordnance duties at the San Antonio Arsenal in Texas and the Watertown Arsenal in Massachusetts. He was then appointed superintendent of the gun factory at the Watervliet Arsenal in New York, which was followed by assignment as executive officer at the Sandy Hook Proving Ground. From December 1916 to February 1917, Westervelt advised the technical staff at the International Arms and Fuse Company in Bloomfield, New Jersey. From February to May 1917, he served as adjutant of the 8th Field Artillery Regiment. With the Army expanding after American entry into World War I in April 1917, Westervelt was promoted to major of Field Artillery in May and assigned as adjutant of the 1st Field Artillery Brigade.

While with the American Expeditionary Forces in France, Westervelt served as chief of First Army Artillery's Materiel Section, commander of First Army Artillery, and assistant to the American Expeditionary Forces Chief of Field Artillery. He was promoted to temporary Colonel in August 1917 and temporary brigadier general in April 1918. After the war, Westervelt was named president of the Army's Caliber Board. Often referred to as the Westervelt Board, the panel made a comprehensive post-war study of artillery caliber sizes, types of ammunition, and transport, then made recommendations on which materiel to procure and field. One of the Westervelt Board's recommendations evolved into the M2 105mm howitzer, and another into the 75mm antitank gun, both of which played important roles in US success during World War II.

== Later career ==
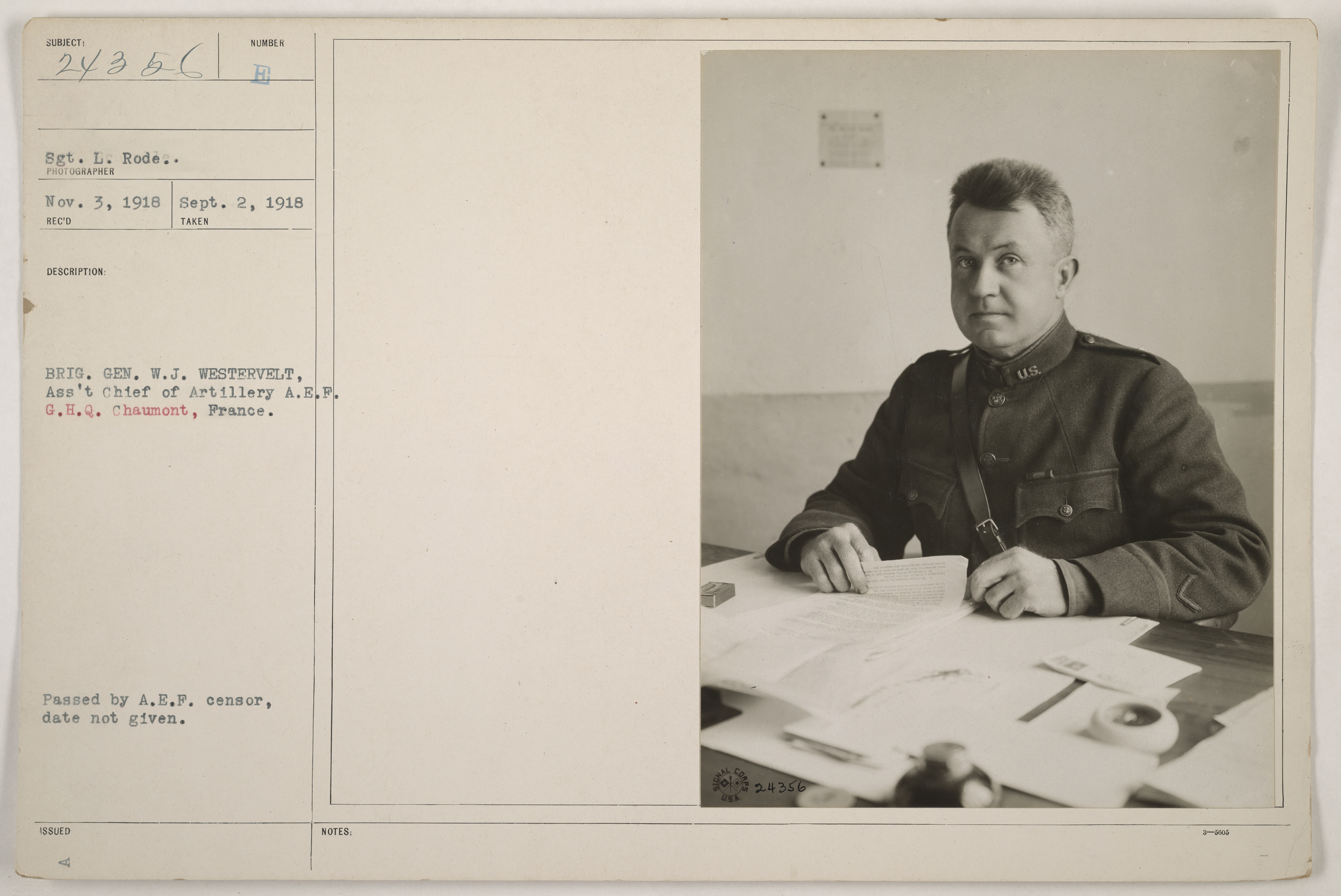
Westervelt as a brigadier general in September 1918

Westervelt returned to his permanent rank of major in July 1919 and was promoted to lieutenant colonel in September 1919. He served at the Watervliet Arsenal from 1919 to 1923 and commanded the facility from 1921 to 1923. From 1923 to 1927, Westervelt served as U.S. military attaché in Paris. From August 1927 to March 1928, he served on the staff of the Second Corps Area at Fort Jay, New York. He retired as a lieutenant colonel in April 1928; in June 1930, the US Congress enacted legislation permitting First World War general officers to retire at their highest rank, and Westervelt was promoted to brigadier general on the retired list.

After leaving the army, Westervelt resided in Winnetka, Illinois and worked as Director of Research Laboratories for Sears, Roebuck and Co. in Chicago; his West Point classmate Robert E. Wood was president of Sears. In the early 1930s, Westervelt took leave from Sears to accept government post as Director of processing and Marketing for the Agricultural Adjustment Administration. After retiring from Sears in 1938, Westervelt lived in New York City, where he was a consultant for and director of Ross & Company, an engineering firm, in addition to serving as a director of several other corporations. From August to November 1940, he was recalled to active duty for World War II and served on the staff of the Chief of Ordnance. During the rest of the war, he was one of the civilian members of first the federal Supply Priorities and Allocations Board, and later its successor, the War Production Board. He was a member of the American Ordnance Association and American Society of Mechanical Engineers, and was a charter member of the ASME's Nuclear Energy Application Committee. Westervelt was a member of New York City's University Club, Boston's St. Botolph Club, and Philadelphia's Racquet Club.

In 1951, Westervelt began to experience health problems, and he moved to Burlington, Vermont to live near members of his family. Near the end of his life, he resided at the Brattleboro Retreat. He died at the retreat on 1 March 1960. Westervelt was buried at Cimetière Mont-Royal in Outremont borough, Montreal, Canada.

== Awards ==
Westervelt was a recipient of the Army Distinguished Service Medal for his accomplishments during World War I. His foreign First World War awards included:

- Legion of Honor (Officer) (France)
- Order of St Michael and St George (Companion) (United Kingdom)
- Order of the Crown of Italy (Commander)

The additional awards Westervelt received during his military career included:

- Spanish War Service Medal
- Philippine Campaign Medal
- Mexican Border Service Medal
- World War I Victory Medal

In 1969, Westervelt was inducted into the Ordnance Corps Hall of Fame.

=== Distinguished Service Medal citation ===
"The President of the United States of America, authorized by Act of Congress, July 9, 1918, takes pleasure in presenting the Army Distinguished Service Medal to Brigadier General William I. Westervelt, United States Army, for exceptionally meritorious and distinguished services to the Government of the United States, in a duty of great responsibility during World War I. As Assistant to the Chief of Artillery, through his initiative, organizing ability, and comprehensive knowledge of the technique and tactics of Artillery in all its branches and particularly through his complete knowledge of Artillery material, General Westervelt has rendered services of exceptional value to the Government."

Service: United States Army Rank: Brigadier General Division: Assistant to the Chief of Artillery Action Date: World War I Orders: War Department, General Orders No. 59 (1919)

== Family ==
In 1918, Westervelt married Dorothy Jocelyn, the daughter of Brigadier General Stephen Perry Jocelyn. They were the parents of three children Peter, Dirck, and Jane. Peter Westervelt was a physicist and college professor who was prominent for his research of nonlinear acoustics.

== Patents granted ==
- Automatic gun, April 21, 1925, number 1,709,162 (with William Summer-Russell)
- Paint brush, January 28, 1941, number 2,230,126
- Interference Reducing Method of Secret Communication, August 2, 1944, number 2,531,951 (with three others)

== Works by ==
- "The Centennial of the Military Academy". Journal of the Military Service Institution of the United States. Governors island, New York: Military Service Institution of the United States. September 1905. pp. 565–568 – via Google Books.
- "A Challenge to American Engineers". Army Ordnance. Washington, DC: Army Ordnance Association. September–October 1920. pp. 59–64 – via Google Books.
- "Profits In Research". Egg and Poultry. Chicago: Institute of American Poultry Industries. January 1938. p. 549 – via Google Books.

== Dates of rank ==
Westervelt's effective dates of rank were:

- Second Lieutenant (Field Artillery), 13 June 1900
- First Lieutenant (Field Artillery), 1 July 1901
- Captain (Ordnance), 28 September 1906
- Captain (Field Artillery), 25 June 1907
- Major (Ordnance), 22 November 1913
- Major (Field Artillery), 15 May 1917
- Colonel (National Army), 5 August 1917
- Brigadier General (National Army), 12 April 1918
- Major (Regular Army), 31 July 1919
- Lieutenant Colonel (Regular Army), 28 September 1919
- Lieutenant Colonel (Retired), 22 April 1928
- Brigadier General (Retired), 21 June 1930
- Brigadier General (Regular Army), 27 August 1940
- Brigadier General (Retired), 29 November 1940
