= Francis W. Nye =

United States Air Force general (1918–2019)

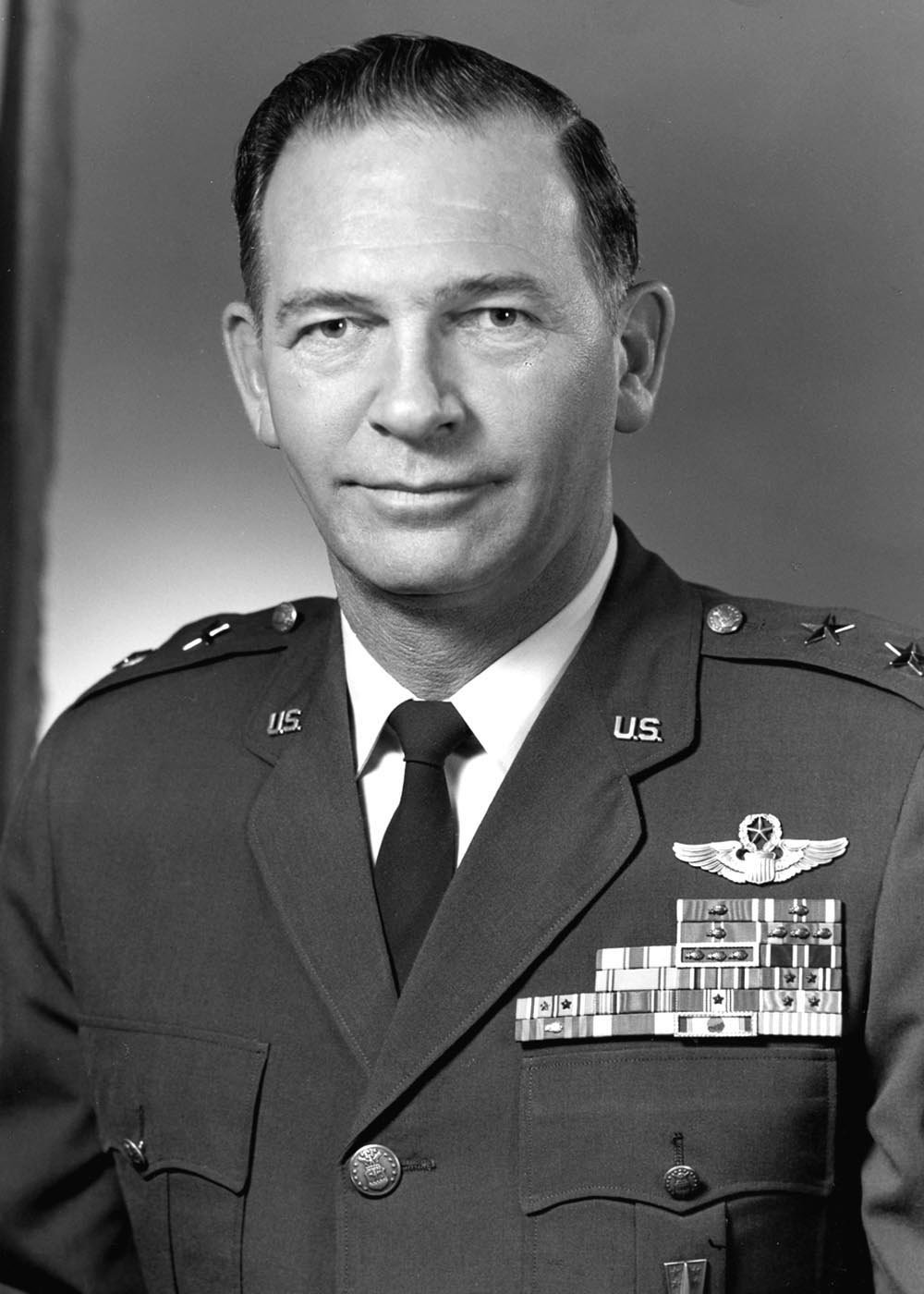
- Born: Francis Walter Nye; June 29, 1918; Barton, Vermont, U.S.
- Died: January 13, 2019 (aged 100); Albuquerque, New Mexico, U.S.
- Burial place: Santa Fe National Cemetery
- Military career
- Allegiance: United States
- Branch: United States Air Force
- Service years: 1941–1972
- Rank: Major General
- Commands: 1969: Field Command, DASA; 1966: 18th Strategic Aerospace Division; 1959: 28th Bomb Wing
- Conflicts: World War II; Korean War
- Awards: Legion of Merit (2); Distinguished Flying Cross (2)

Francis Walter Nye (June 29, 1918 – January 13, 2019) was a United States Air Force major general who was a B-24 Liberator and B-29 Superfortress combat pilot. He was commander, Field Command, Defense Atomic Support Agency, Sandia Base, New Mexico.

== Education and career ==
Nye graduated from Barton Academy (Vermont) (1936) and the University of Vermont (BSc, 1941). He enlisted as Army Air Corps flight cadet after graduation. In February 1942, he completed flight training and was commissioned a second lieutenant. Through April 1943, he flew 36 missions with the 98th Bombardment Group from bases in Palestine, Egypt, and North Africa. He flew B-17s, and B-24s. Nye returned to the United States in April 1943 and, in September, entered the B-29 aircraft program, first as an acceptance test pilot at the Boeing plant in Wichita, Kansas.

Nye's crew was formed at Salina, Kansas, and assigned B-29 serial # 42-6232 in April 1944. This aircraft was named "Kickapoo II." Captain Nye had finished a tour of duty previously with 36 missions in a B-24's named "Kickapoo" in the Mediterranean Theater of Operations. Nye was Aircraft Commander of an original crew that departed from Salina on April 4, 1944, for Kharagpur, India, and was one of the first to leave Salina, and arrive at Kharagpur, with stops in Presque Isle, Maine; Marrakesh, Morocco; Cairo, Egypt; and Karachi, India. This crew flew several "operational" over-the-hump missions to Pengshan A-7, the forward base in China. This crew flew the first mission by B-29's to Bangkok, Thailand from Kharagpur (June 5, 1944), and the first mission from Pengshan A-7 to Yawata, Japan on June 15, 1944.

On June 20, 1944, Nye was ordered to the 468th Bombardment Group as assistant S-3 (deputy group operations officer). In August 1944, Nye flew the longest B-29 mission (over 4,000 miles (6,400 km)) in World War II by any type of aircraft to Palembang, Sumatra, from a forward base at China Bay, Ceylon. Nye flew this mission while substituting for a pilot who had become ill. Nye flew 11 combat missions with the 468th Bombardment Group in the China-Burma-India Theater. In May 1945, he went with the 468 BG to Tinian Island and then to Roswell, New Mexico. Nye finished World War II on Tinian as group operations officer.

In September 1946, he began duty as a Reserve Officers Training Corps professor of air science and tactics at the University of Massachusetts Amherst.

Nye flew 19 Korean War combat missions with the 22d Bombardment Wing. Following an assignment to SAC Headquarters in May 1953 and attending the Air War College (July 1956-June 1957), Nye became a commander of various military organizations.

He also served as chairman of the Rated Personnel Requirements and Allocations Committee at the Pentagon and was appointed deputy director for plans and policy in the Directorate of Plans in August 1968. In November 1968, he was appointed chairman of the U.S. delegation of the Inter-American Defense Board, the Joint Brazil-U.S. Defense Commission, and the U.S. section, Joint Mexican-U.S. Defense Commission. In July 1969, General Nye became deputy director of plans. Nye was later assigned as commander, Field Command, Defense Atomic Support Agency, Sandia Base, New Mexico.

== Personal life, family, and death ==
He born to Percy and Clara Murphy Nye, in Barton, June 29, 1918.

His wife, Nina, died in 2017. Nye died in January 2019 at the age of 100.

== Awards and decorations ==
His military decorations included the Legion of Merit with oak leaf cluster, Distinguished Flying Cross with oak leaf cluster, Bronze Star with oak leaf cluster, Air Medal with three oak leaf clusters, Joint Service Commendation Medal, Air Force Commendation Medal, Distinguished Unit Citation Emblem with three oak leaf clusters, and Air Force Outstanding Unit Award Ribbon.

- Legion of Merit
- Distinguished Flying Cross with oak leaf cluster
- Bronze Star with oak leaf cluster
- Air Medal with three oak leaf clusters
- Joint Service Commendation Medal
- Air Force Commendation Medal
- Distinguished Unit Citation with three oak leaf clusters
- Air Force Outstanding Unit Award
