= Peter Westervelt =

American physicist

- Born: December 16, 1919
- Died: January 24, 2015 (aged 95); Warwick, Rhode Island, U.S.
- Citizenship: American
- Education: Massachusetts Institute of Technology
- Known for: Parametric array
- Scientific career
- Fields: Physics
- Workplaces: Brown University

Peter Westervelt (December 16, 1919 – January 24, 2015) was an American physicist, noted for his work in nonlinear acoustics, and Professor Emeritus of Physics at Brown University.

== Education ==
Peter Jocelyn Westervelt was the son of US Army Brigadier General William I. Westervelt and Dorothy (Jocelyn) Westervelt, and the grandson of Brigadier General Stephen Perry Jocelyn. George Conrad Westervelt, a United States Navy officer and aviation pioneer, was his uncle. He received his BS in Physics from MIT in 1947, and his PhD in Physics from MIT in 1951, at which time he joined the Physics Department at Brown University.

== Career ==
Westervelt began his career in 1940-41 at the MIT Radiation Laboratory and the Harvard Underwater Sound Laboratory, where he worked with researchers including Frederick Vinton Hunt, Leo Beranek (National Medal of Science winner) and Phillip Morse during the Second World War.

During his long and distinguished career, he held responsible assignments with the National Academy of Sciences, and the National Research Council, and was elected Fellow of the American Physical Society, the Acoustical Society of America, and the American Astronomical Society. He served as Assistant Attache for Research, U.S. Navy, at the American Embassy in London, U.K., and as a Consultant to Bolt, Beranek, and Newman (now BBN Technologies). Westervelt also performed research at the University of Texas at Austin, where he developed new techniques, having widespread application, for the study of sound-by-sound scattering and the laser-excited thermoacoustics. Westervelt was awarded the Lord Rayleigh Medal in 1985, by the British Institute for Acoustics. He became Professor Emeritus at the Brown University Physics Department in 1989.

== Research ==
He is especially renowned for his application of the theory of Sir Michael James Lighthill, for his important contributions to the understanding of nonlinear scattering of sound by sound, and for his discoveries of the parametric array and the laser-excited thermoacoustic array. His lifetime of physics research spans other aspects of acoustics as well, include the contributions to the understanding of acoustic radiation pressure, which has applications to Acoustic levitation and other devices which exploit macrosonic phenomena and acoustic streaming, as well as to several other fields of Physics (with example references shown here), including General Relativity, (primarily in the area of gravitational waves), including Gravitational phenomena analogous to the parametric array, Cosmology, low temperature physics the Physics of Sound in Liquid Helium, and High Energy Particle Physics (primarily in the area of cosmic ray particle detectors.)

== Awards ==
Peter Westervelt was awarded the Rayleigh Medal by the British Institute of Acoustics in 1985. He also received the Silver Medal in Physical Acoustics from the Acoustical Society of America for his discovery and explanation of the Parametric Array in 2008.
