= NECAP =

Series of annual standardized tests in parts of New England in the United States

The National Emergency Airborne Command Post is now named National Airborne Operations Center (NAOC). Or see kneecap.

The New England Common Assessment Program (universally abbreviated NECAP, and generally pronounced "knee cap") was a series of reading, writing, mathematics and science achievement tests, administered annually, which were developed in response to the Federal No Child Left Behind Act. Starting in 2005, school students in New Hampshire, Rhode Island, and Vermont participated in NECAP, and Maine joined the assessment program in 2009. It was a collaborative project of the New Hampshire, Rhode Island and Vermont departments of education, with assistance from the National Center for the Improvement of Educational Assessments. Measured Progress, an assessment contractor from Dover, New Hampshire, coordinates production, administration, scoring and reporting.

The NECAP tests measured students’ academic knowledge and skills relative to Grade Expectations which were created by teams of teachers representing the original three participating states. Student scores were reported at four levels of academic achievement; Proficient with Distinction, Proficient, Partially Proficient and Substantially Below Proficient. Reading and math were assessed in grades 3–8 and 11, writing was assessed in grades 5, 8 and 11, and science was assessed in grades 4, 8 and 11. The reading, math and writing tests were administered each year in October. The science tests were administered in May. Students in Maine did not participate in the science NECAP; instead, Maine students in grades 5 and 8 took the science MEA (Maine Education Assessment).

The states supporting this initiative planned to phase over to the newer Common Core State Standards Initiative by 2014.

== Purpose ==
NECAP provided assessment results for students in Grades 3-8 and 11 based on a common set of grade expectations. The scores served a variety of purposes, including –

- Measurement of individual student achievement and progress
- Program evaluation and systems-change
- Public reporting
- School accountability and identification of schools in need of improvement

== Approach ==
NECAP tests were made up of multiple choice, short answer and constructed response questions. The writing test also included an extended response essay question, and the science test included an inquiry session that required students to analyze experimental data. Every NECAP test question was aligned to a specific grade expectation.

== Teacher Involvement ==
One major goal of NECAP was to create tests relevant to classroom instruction. To accomplish this goal, teachers were involved in test development in a variety of ways, including:

- Development of the Grade Expectations
- Review of test items for alignment with the grade expectations, as well as absence of bias
- Setting standards (determining the test score needed to be considered “proficient’)

== Content ==
The NECAP tests provided broad scores in reading, writing, mathematics and science literacy, as well as the following strand or domain scores:

- The Reading assessment addressed Word Identification, Vocabulary, Initial Understanding and Analysis/Interpretation. Comprehension was measured using both literary and informational text.
- The Mathematics assessment addressed Numbers and Operations, Geometry and Measurement, Functions and Algebra, and Data, Statistics and Probability
- The Writing assessment addressed a variety of writing genre including narratives, informational writing and response to both literary and informational text. Writing conventions and structures of writing were also assessed.
- The Science assessment addressed four domains: Life Science, Physical Science, Earth Space Science and Inquiry.

== Science inquiry ==
The inquiry section of the NECAP Science test provided a unique approach to assessing scientific literacy. Students in grades 4 and 8 work in pairs to conduct an actual, hands-on science experiment (11th graders use authentic data from existing research). Then, working independently, they use their data to analyze results, test hypotheses and make predictions. In other words, the test requires students to think and act like scientists.

== Sources ==
- Asmar, Melanie. "Federal law means more school testing: Grades three through eight targeted." Concord Monitor. August 1, 2005.
- McKenna, Bredan. "Feds accept Vermont's plan for student testing; $1.2 million at stake." Barre Montpelier Times Argus. August 14, 2005.
- Rood, Jeremiah. "NH awaits word on NCLB plan." Laconia Citizen. July 16, 2005.
- Rood, Jeremiah, and Marcus Weisgerber. "Feds won't punish states over delay in 'No Child' testing." Foster's Daily Democrat. July 21, 2005.
- Weisgerber, Marcus. "State may not be sanctioned over No Child Left Behind testing plans." Foster's Daily Democrat. July 19, 2005.
- Weiss-Tisman, Howard. "Feds OK Vermont education proposal." Brattleboro Reformer. July 22, 2005.
