= Orleans, Vermont =

- Village
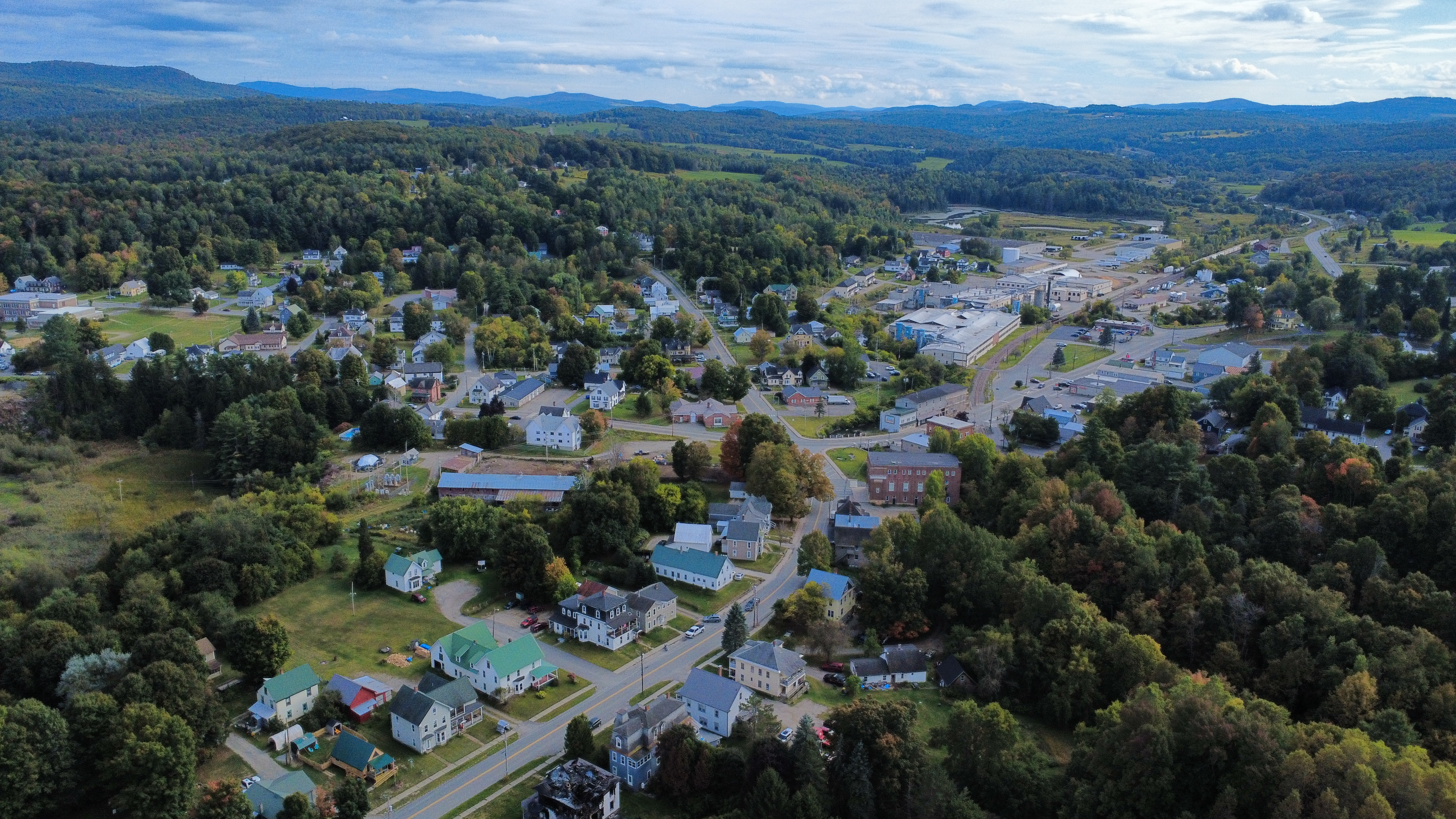
- Orleans, VT, from the north

- Location within Vermont Location within the United States
- Coordinates: 44°48′32″N 72°12′04″W
- Country: United States
- State: Vermont
- County: Orleans
- Town: Barton

Area
  - Total: 0.94 sq mi (2.44 km^{2})
  - Land: 0.91 sq mi (2.35 km^{2})
  - Water: 0.031 sq mi (0.08 km^{2})
- Elevation: 764 ft (233 m)

Population (2020)
  - Total: 788
  - Density: 868/sq mi (335/km^{2})
- Time zone: UTC−5 (Eastern (EST))
  - Summer (DST): UTC−4 (EDT)
- ZIP code: 05860
- Area code: 802
- FIPS code: 50-53575
- GNIS feature ID: 2378324

Orleans is a village in the northwestern corner of Barton, Orleans County, Vermont, United States. With a population of 788 at the 2020 census, it is the largest village in the county.

== History ==
Roger Enos purchased land in 1820 in the area from Ira Allen. He had been given a land grant as a veteran in lieu of pay after the Revolutionary War; he may also have purchased this parcel from Herman Allen. It was named "Barton Landing"; this was the first place where craft could be safely loaded for transportation down the Barton River to Lake Memphremagog. It was at the confluence of the Willoughby and Barton rivers, providing sufficient water for flotation. Native Americans had used this landing for years before the pioneers.

Enos built the first building, a sawmill, at the confluence. Jesse Cook bought this building in 1830 to convert to a textile mill for weaving cloth, part of the northern economy using cotton from the South. In 1839 John Little converted it into a grain mill.

Lovinas Chandler bought this building in 1869 to use as a lumber mill. His son, who founded the E. L. Chandler Company, expanded the business here and in Barton Village in the 1890s. About the turn of the 20th century, Parker Young Company bought this complex of buildings. The 1928 flood ruined these buildings, together with causing other damage throughout the region.

Parker Young sold these properties back to E.L. Chandler. The owners developed the Sweat-Comings Company, the Vermont American Corporation, and finally, the Baumritter Corporation. The latter's furniture division expanded from a payroll of $120,000 in 1954 to $2,500,000 in 1968. Then it was sold to Ethan Allen Manufacturing.

In 1833, the Valley House was built as a restaurant and tavern. In 1875 twenty rooms were added for an inn. The building was destroyed by fire in 1998.

The railroad reached the village in 1859–1860. Railroad accidents were not uncommon. On November 9, 1909, a crew member was killed in a head-on collision between two locomotives, just north of the rail intersection with Main Street. Near the same place, on March 12, 1913, another head-on collision killed one of the crew.

The railroad requested that the village change its name to avoid confusion with Barton Village. The village changed its name to Orleans in 1908 by popular vote, to the name of the county.

In the late 1910s, the Ku Klux Klan was first revived in Atlanta. It gradually expanded into northern and midwestern cities, where anxieties about migration, immigration, and social changes had heightened because of rapid industrialization and movement of peoples. The KKK promoted itself as a fraternal organization, among many that had been started since the late 19th century. In this period, it was primarily opposed to Catholic and Jewish immigrants, but kept some of its racist background. A chapter was started in Orleans. A 1918 photograph shows children at the old Opera House, a number of them dressed in KKK hoods, and others in blackface.

In the late 1970s, as efforts were made to improve water quality and the environment, the federal and state governments stopped the village from dumping raw sewage into the Barton River. Orleans built a new treatment plant, which cost $2.8 million, 90% of which was paid for by state and federal governments. The village disconnected its old storm sewers from the sanitary sewage system.

In 1999, the local Ethan Allen plant employed 600 workers. This dropped substantially in the 21st century, as it moved some manufacturing offshore or to areas with lower labor costs.

== Government ==
Like all Vermont incorporated villages, the government is run directly by the people. Residents conduct the village meeting on the second Tuesday of March. They elect all officers, including those in the Fire Department.

In 2008, the fire department provided service to the village and to the adjacent town of Brownington.

=== Water and sewage ===
The village pumps water from the Willoughby River to its high reservoir during off-peak hours. The water is treated with chlorine, fluoride and polyphosphate. Sewage is treated by an anoxic-oxic system.

Billing and fees are quarterly. Households or apartment buildings pay a flat fee of $39 per quarter, plus $2 for 1,000 US gallons (3,800 L; 830 imp gal) of water beyond 5,000 US gallons (19,000 L; 4,200 imp gal). There is a flat fee of $78.12 per dwelling per quarter for sewage.

=== Education ===
The village and surrounding area supports a graded school. The effective spending per pupil was $11,770 in 2008. The average in Vermont was $11,548.

== Geography ==
According to the United States Census Bureau, the village has a total area of 0.7 square mile (1.8 km^{2}), all land.

The village is at the northwestern corner of the town of Barton. At the edge of the village, the Willoughby River Falls is a 200-foot (61 m) long stretch of river with cascades and a chute. In spring rainbow trout migrate up the river and falls from Lake Memphremagog in order to spawn.

== Demographics ==
Historical population
Census	Pop.	Note	%±
1880	378		—
1890	482		27.5%
1900	677		40.5%
1910	1,131		67.1%
1920	1,358		20.1%
1930	1,301		−4.2%
1940	1,332		2.4%
1950	1,261		−5.3%
1960	1,240		−1.7%
1970	1,138		−8.2%
1980	983		−13.6%
1990	806		−18.0%
2000	826		2.5%
2010	818		−1.0%
2020	788		−3.7%
U.S. Decennial Census

The village showed a gain in population in 2000, the first since 1940.

As of the census of 2000, there were 826 people, 364 households, and 228 families residing in the village. The population density was 1,204.2 people per square mile (462.2/km^{2}). There were 400 housing units at an average density of 583.1/sq mi (223.8/km^{2}). The racial makeup of the village was 97.82% White, 0.12% African American, 0.36% Native American, 0.48% Asian, and 1.21% from two or more races. Hispanic or Latino of any race were 0.36% of the population.

There were 364 households, out of which 30.2% had children under the age of 18 living with them, 47.3% were married couples living together, 9.9% had a female householder with no husband present, and 37.1% were non-families. 33.8% of all households were made up of individuals, and 16.8% had someone living alone who was 65 years of age or older. The average household size was 2.27 and the average family size was 2.84.

In the village, the age distribution of the population shows 25.2% under the age of 18, 7.4% from 18 to 24, 25.4% from 25 to 44, 23.7% from 45 to 64, and 18.3% who were 65 years of age or older. The median age was 40 years. For every 100 females, there were 99.5 males. For every 100 females age 18 and over, there were 93.1 males.

== Economy ==
=== Personal income ===
The median income for a household in the village was $26,131, and the median income for a family was $34,583. Males had a median income of $25,789 versus $21,750 for females. The per capita income for the village was $15,318. About 11.6% of families and 12.3% of the population were below the poverty line, including 13.2% of those under age 18 and 12.5% of those age 65 or over.

=== Industry ===
Ethan Allen Manufacturing employs about 325 workers locally. In 2005 the plant was valued at $7,048,200 and was sited on 85 acres (340,000 m^{2}).

=== Media ===
Christian Ministries owns radio station W243AE which broadcasts out of Orleans on 96.5 FM.

=== Electricity ===
Orleans operates its own Electric Department which, aside from serving the village, also provides power to the parts of Barton outside the village, as well as West Brownington and East Irasburg. It has 665 customers. It does not generate power but purchases it in bulk. It maintains the distribution system. 70% of the department's expense is allocated for power purchases.

== Culture ==
Orleans has a library which is open 28 hours a week over four days. It is a non-profit corporation. There is one part-time paid librarian. Other help is volunteer. The library is unique in the county for having an endowment left as an estate which also constructed the building.

== Education ==
The elementary school was recognized as being among the ten "most improved" schools in the state in 2008. It also exceeded state averages in every category on the standardized NECAP test and was the only school in the area to do so.

== Transportation ==
=== Major routes ===
The opening of the Interstate north on November 9, 1972, and opening south in 1978 affected the town comparable to the opening of the railway a century earlier.

- Interstate 91 – Barton village southbound, Derby northbound
- U.S. Route 5 – Barton village, southbound, to Coventry, northbound
- Vermont Route 58 – To Irasburg westbound and to Westmore eastbound

During the April school vacation since at least 1983, the village has hired school children to clean the village streets for one day as part of a village "spring cleaning."

=== Bridges ===
Willoughby Falls Bridge needed replacing in 2007. It will cost $1.6 million. The village must contribute 10% ($160,000). This was the most expensive state project in Orleans County that year.

=== Local community public and private transportation ===
Vermont Transit services Orleans.

=== Railroads ===
While the Washington County Railroad (The Vermont Railway System) runs through Orleans, it does not service the town.

== Notable people ==
- Henry Alexander Stafford, pinch hitter for the New York Giants; born in Orleans.

== Bibliography ==
- Darrell Hoyt (1985). Sketches of Orleans, Vermont. Mempremagog Press. ISBN 0-9610860-2-5.
