= Hinman =

Hinman is a surname. Notable people with the surname include:

- Arthur Hinman (1890–1915), Australian rules footballer
- Benjamin Hinman (1719–1810), American surveyor, soldier, and politician
- Bill Hinman (1892–1964), Australian rules footballer
- Brian Hinman (born 1961), American entrepreneur
- George E. Hinman (1870–1961), Connecticut politician
- George Wheeler Hinman (1864–1927), American writer and publisher
- Harold J. Hinman (1877–1955), New York assemblyman and judge
- Harvey D. Hinman (1865–1954), New York state senator
- Jacqueline Hinman (born 1961), American businesswoman
- Lawrence M. Hinman (born 1942), American philosopher
- Paul Hinman (born 1959), Canadian entrepreneur and politician

== See also ==
- Justice Hinman (disambiguation)
