= Brownington Village Historic District =

Historic district in Vermont, United States

- U.S. National Register of Historic Places
- U.S. Historic district
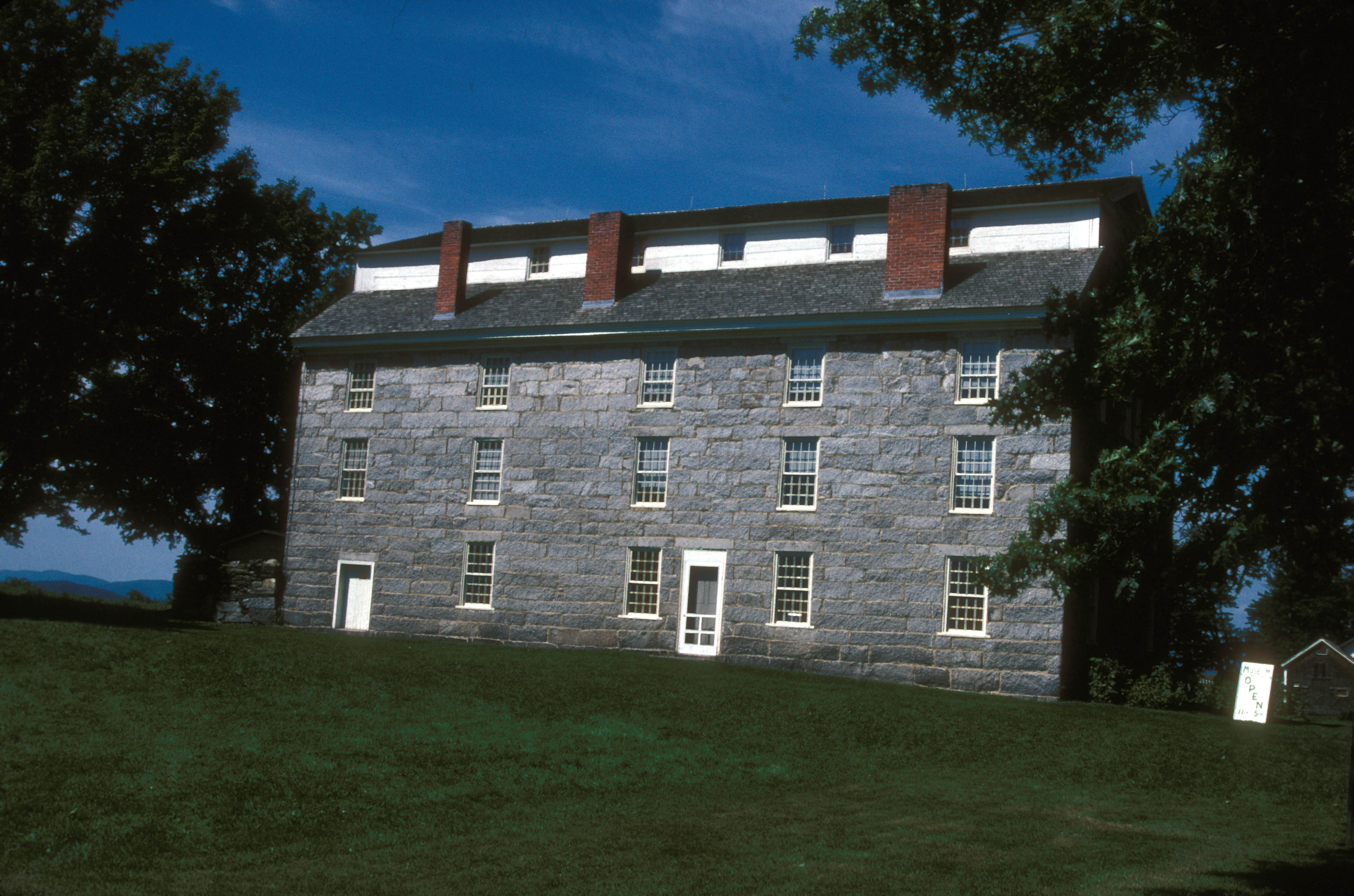
- Athenian Hall

- Location within Vermont Location within the United States
- Location: Hinman Settler Road and Brownington Center Road, Brownington, Vermont
- Coordinates: 44.83694°N 72.16861°W
- Area: 110 acres (45 ha)
- Architectural style: Greek Revival
- NRHP reference No.: 73000197
- Added to NRHP: May 9, 1973

The Brownington Village Historic District is a historic site in Brownington, Vermont, United States. It is located near the intersection of Hinman and Brownington Center roads. It was added to the U.S. National Register of Historic Places on June 9, 1973. The district consists of five buildings within the Old Stone House Museum complex and three neighboring houses, dating from the early 19th century.

== History ==
In the early 19th century, Brownington was a community on the Hinman Settler Road, a primary route in the county. It was on the stagecoach route from Boston, Massachusetts to Montreal, Quebec, Canada. Prior to 1816, the village was one of two county seats. Residents developed a number of facilities to take advantage of the town's situation.

== Old Stone House (Athenian Hall) ==
Alexander Twilight alone constructed this four-story granite building which was used as a dormitory for out-of-town boarding students at the nearby Orleans County Grammar School. He called it "Athenian Hall." Granite was almost never used in building construction in the early 19th century in Orleans County. No one knows where the granite came from.

The dormitory closed in 1859, two years after Twilight's death. The Orleans County Historical Society bought it in 1918 for $500. Today it is called "The Old Stone House Museum." It is one of the best-preserved institutional buildings of its era in the United States. Operated as an historical museum, it contains collections of 18th, 19th, and early 20th-century furniture, paintings, decorative art, folk art, tools and household items.

== Alexander Twilight House ==
Across the road from the Old Stone House is Alexander Twilight's own house, which he built in 1830. He and his wife accepted several boarding students at their house each year; these students slept in rooms on the second floor of the house. Students continued to board with the Twilights after Athenian Hall dormitory was built. The Orleans County Historical Society bought the house in 1999. It has been restored and serves as a visitor center for the Museum and as an office for the Historical Society.

== Lawrence Barn ==
This is an English-style barn built during the first half of the 19th century. It is similar to the one that was originally associated with the Twilight House. It was moved to its present site in 1997. It houses an exhibit illustrating two centuries of farming in Orleans County.

== Museum Education Center ==
This building was probably the original house on the site of the Alexander Twilight House. It was donated to the Museum in 1978 and is used as an education center.

== Cyrus Eaton House ==
Cyrus Eaton, a friend of Twilight, built this house in 1834. The architecture is late Federal-style, partially remodeled in the vernacular Greek Revival style. The building has been thoroughly restored, including the cedar shake roof. It contains the archives and research collections of the Historical Society. Behind the house is a well established mid-nineteenth century perennial garden.

== Samuel Read Hall House ==
This house was built by George West in 1831 in the Federal style. For 21 years it was the home of Samuel Read Hall, who taught at the Orleans County Grammar School.

Purchased by the Historical Society in 2006, the Samuel Read Hall House is being restored.

== Brownington Congregational Church and Village Cemetery ==
The church was completed in 1841. Both Twilight and Hall were ministers there. In 1899 Brownington native William Barstow Strong, who had attended the Orleans County Grammar School, paid for extensive remodeling of the church's interior and furnished a bell and spire for the belfry.

== Prospect Hill and Observatory Tower ==
When the classrooms of the grammar school were nearby, students climbed this hill for evening vespers. In 1898, Strong built an observatory at the top. This was recreated by the Grange in 1975 for the national bicentennial. It was rebuilt again in 1998.

== Rice and Going Hotel ==
Built in 1815, this farmhouse was once operated as a hotel. It is privately owned today.

== Orleans County Grammar School ==
William Baxter paid for the construction of this building in 1823. It was constructed at the base of Prospect Hill. In 1869, it was moved down the road by about 1/3 mile (0.54 km). The building was owned by the town of Brownington and housed the Grange.

In 2016, it was moved west of the church closer to the District. Simulating the work of the 19th century, 44 oxen appeared to be hitched to the historic building to tow it to the new site.

== See also ==
- National Register of Historic Places listings in Orleans County, Vermont
