= Old House Museum =

Old House Museum may refer to:

- Old House Museum, Bakewell, Derbyshire, England
- Old Stone House Museum, USA
- Oldest House Museum in St. Augustine, Florida, USA
- Oldest House Museum in Key West, Florida; operated by the Old Island Restoration Foundation, USA
