= Benjamin Hinman =

American surveyor, soldier, and legislator

- Born: 22 January 1719; Woodbury, Connecticut
- Died: 22 March 1810 (aged 91); Southbury, Connecticut
- Military career
- Allegiance: Continental Army
- Service years: 1745–1777
- Rank: Colonel

Benjamin Hinman (22 January 1719 – 22 March 1810) was an American surveyor, soldier and legislator.

He participated in the Colonial and Revolutionary Wars and took part in the Constitutional Convention of 1787. Notably, he was present at Bernetz Brook where General Howe was killed in 1758. He was also one of the first American officers of the revolutionary war and led a regiment into the field to secure the Hudson corridor from the British a year before the declaration of independence. In later life, he was involved in the exploration and surveying of portions of Vermont. In modern times, he is known for his often misrepresented confrontations with Benedict Arnold and New York General Philip Schuyler.

== Biography ==
Hinman was born in the town of Woodbury, Connecticut. His family was among the original settlers of that community in the 1670s. His parents were Benjamin Hinman II (b. 1692) and Sarah Sherman. His grandfather, Captain John Sherman, served in the Connecticut legislature and was Speaker of the House of Representatives. Colonel Hinman's parents perished of sickness in 1727 leaving young Benjamin and his siblings orphans. The children were taken in by relatives and raised in the family of Judge Noah Hinman.

Colonel Hinman rose to prominence as a military officer during the era of the French and Indian Wars; first serving as quartermaster in a contingent of Connecticut horse in 1745. In 1751, he served in a troop under General Roger Wolcott in the invasion of Canada. Then in 1753, he received a commission as cornet (a cavalry second lieutenant) in the 13th Connecticut Regiment of foot and horse. Next, he was promoted to Captain of the 6th company of foot and assigned to the regiment of Colonel Elizur Goodrich in 1755. This unit was involved in defending Fort Crown Point near Lake Champlain from the French army. Hinman's company took part in the battle between the forces of Sir William Johnson and Baron Dieskau in September of that year. Promoted to Major of the 4th regiment in 1756, he participated in the invasion of Canada in Colonel Whiting's Regiment. In 1757, he was in the field by commission of Governor Fitch and involved in the campaigns around lakes George and Champlain. He was promoted to Lieutenant Colonel in the third regiment of Foot by Governor Pitken in 1758. The famous Israel Putnam was assigned as a Major under him. Hinman was present in the action at Bernitz Brook when Lord Howe was killed and his unit took part in the abortive battle at Ticonderoga under General James Abercrombie shortly thereafter. A great many losses were sustained by the British and Provincial Army at this time and most of the soldiers from Woodbury never returned home again. In 1759, Col. Hinman was again in service in the successful campaign that all but ended the war in North America. In that year, he fought at Fort Ticonderoga, Crown point and Quebec. As hostilities declined, Colonel Hinman was elected to serve as a representative (deputy) in the Connecticut Colonial Legislature serving in sessions in 1760–1762 and again in 1767–1768. From 1767 to 1771 he held a commission as Lieutenant Colonel of a regiment of Horse and Foot. He became Colonel of the same regiment (the 13th) in 1771 and held this commission through the beginning of the revolutionary war.

== Revolutionary War ==
An ardent patriot, Colonel Hinman was a member of the committee of correspondence for Woodbury in 1774. Immediately following the battles of Lexington and Concord in April 1775, he was drawn from the existing militia officers to command one of the 6 regiments raised for the “special defense” of the colony(s). Now, as Colonel of the 4th Connecticut Regiment, he was ordered with four companies to Greenwich and had one company at Boston. In May, he was ordered by Connecticut Governor Jonathan Trumbull to March with 10 companies (1000 men) to reinforce the small garrison at Fort Ticonderoga New York. There, Hinman was to “Command the forces of Crown Point and Ticonderoga”; and secure the area from counterattack of the British and their allies. When he arrived, Hinman became a witness to the first and least known of Benedict Arnold's acts of treason toward the budding democracy.

Arnold, who joined Ethan Allen's expedition against Ticonderoga shortly before the fort was taken, was in the area of crown point aboard a captured Sloop when Hinman arrived at Fort Ticonderoga in June. However, unlike Colonels Ethan Allen and Seth Warner who relinquished their commands to Hinman upon his arrival, Benedict Arnold was tenacious of his authority. A Connecticut Captain, just two months prior, Arnold was now brandishing a Massachusetts colonelcy and styling himself as “Commander-in-Chief” of Crown Point. He had perhaps 250 men, the command of two ships, and absolutely no desire to relinquish any authority whatsoever. In his attempt to keep it, Arnold rapidly became a bottle neck to the preparations for war. He interfered with the command of the fort and refused access to it by the Connecticut soldiers except upon condition; and his behavior got progressively worse. Over the next few days, Arnold caused the attempted robbery, abduction and “firing on” of the committee sent by the Massachusetts Congress to investigate into Arnold's activities. Further, the menace of mutiny soon prevailed among his men and a threat was made that the two ships under Arnold's command would be sailed to the British post at Saint John's and surrendered to them. This act, if completed, may have had fatal consequences to the revolutionary cause at that early stage of the conflict.

Hinman had been patient with Arnold and respectful of the interest of the three colonies represented at Ticonderoga to this point; however, upon hearing of the treacherous threat, he immediately sent a detachment to procure the ships and enlist all those of Arnold's men that were willing. The rest were disbanded. Thus, Hinman ended the 7 day dispute over who was in command at Crown Point by taking the last of Arnold's authority from him. The head of the Massachusetts committee, Walter Spooner, commented on the actions of Col Hinman in this difficult situation with the statement that “from the polite, generous, and manly disposition of Colonel Hinman, we may gather the most happy prospects of a campaign at the Northward replete with honor and interest to the Colonies”.

Colonel Hinman continued in the northward, but, he was soon hampered by the lack of supplies tents and gunpowder for his troops; all items that the colony of New York had agreed to furnish but failed to provide. They did, however, send one of their leading citizens, Philip Schuyler, to take command of the Connecticut Troops. In late June, the Second Continental Congress had favored New York with the appointment of Schuyler as a Major General and assigned him to the command of the northward. Unfortunately, the displaced and disgruntled Benedict Arnold was aware of this and soon appeared before Schuyler to complain about his treatment. After their meeting, the sympathetic Schuyler traveled to Fort Ticonderoga, but he did not take significant troops or supplies with him. He did, however, immediately begin attacking the work and character of the New England troops. He also began agitating for the replacement of the existing key officers with substitutes from New York. A situation that prompted Hinman to comment in August that the province of New York abounds with officers, but he had yet to have his curiosity gratified by the sight of one private. Schuyler's habits and decisions soon created a general distrust of his motives among the New England troops and rumors that Schuyler was actually in league with the British abounded. These sentiments continued among the officers and men in the Northern Army until Schuyler was removed by Congress in 1777.

Colonel Hinman continued in the northward into mid December 1775. Although ravaged by sickness, his regiment was the nucleus of the army led to Canada by General Montgomery and was present at the battle of St. Johns, the reduction of Montreal, and siege of Quebec. They were adopted by the Continental Congress in July and officially became members of the newly formed Continental Army in October of that year.

Hinman was again in the field in 1776, and was present with the 13th regiment when Long Island, New York was invaded by the British. Thereafter, as a Colonel of state troops, he was stationed in the Westchester area at Horse neck and the long island sound to support the main army in the late fall and early winter of 1776–1777. He was subsequently involved in repelling General William Tryon's invasion of Danbury Connecticut and took part in the battle of Ridgefield in April, 1777. British military and news papers reported that he had been killed in this action. Hospital records indicate that he may indeed have been wounded at that time. Later in the same year, Col Hinman was at the head of a company of rangers scouting at Bennington and Saratoga. He was present at the surrender of General John Burgoyne at Saratoga in mid October 1777.

Also in October of that year, Colonel Hinman was again elected to a seat in the legislature of Connecticut and continued to serve there in sessions through 1780 and again from 1785–1788. He was a member of the Connecticut Convention that adopted the U.S. Constitution in 1788. Here he voted to formally make Connecticut what it had always been – one of the original 13 states of the union.

In his later years, he was involved with his family in the settlement and exploration of lands in the vicinity of Derby, Vermont. His cousin Timothy Hinman saw to the construction of the Hinman Settler Road in that area.

Benjamin Hinman died in Southbury, New Haven County, Connecticut, in 1810.

== Family ==
He was married to Mary Stiles and they had 5 children. His son Joel was wounded at Danbury in 1777. His nephew was Yale graduate Royal Ralph Hinman who served as Connecticut Secretary of State. His grandson Joel Hinman served with distinction on the Connecticut Supreme Court for many years.

The Hinman family, in general, were taken with the patriotic spirit of those times and many represented Connecticut in the military during the war. Prominent among these were Captain Elisha Hinman, who was among the first American naval officers and served throughout the entire war. Major Benjamin Hinman who served on General Nathanael Greene's staff; and the Captain David Hinman, who served at Ticonderoga, Peekskill, Westchester, the battle at Danbury, repelled the British at New Haven and was a member of the company of rangers mentioned at Bennington and Saratoga.
