= William Carleton (disambiguation) =

William Carleton may refer to:

- William Carleton (1794–1869), Irish novelist
- William Carleton (Massachusetts businessman) (1797–1876), American inventor and philanthropist
- William P. Carleton (1872–1947), Anglo-American film actor, sometimes billed as William Carleton Jr.
- William T. Carleton (1859–1930), Anglo-American film and stage actor
- Will Carleton (1845–1912), American poet
