= Albert Alonzo Robinson =

American civil engineer (1844–1918)

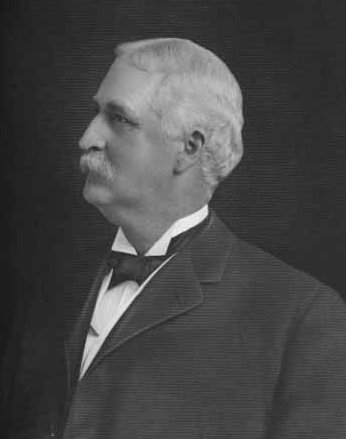
- Born: October 21, 1844; South Reading, Vermont
- Died: November 7, 1918 (aged 74); Topeka, Kansas
- Education: University of Michigan

Albert Alonzo Robinson (October 21, 1844 – November 7, 1918), sometimes referred to as Albert A. Robinson or A. A. Robinson, was an American civil engineer who rose through the ranks of the Atchison, Topeka and Santa Fe Railway to eventually become the railroad's vice president and general manager. After resigning from the Santa Fe, Robinson became president of the Mexican Central Railway.

== Youth and education ==
He was born on October 21, 1844, near South Reading, Vermont. His mother moved the family, after his father's death, to Wisconsin, where Robinson worked as a clerk in his stepfather's store until 1861. When his stepfather became ill and closed the family store, Robinson turned to tobacco farming for a few years to support the family. In 1865 he enrolled at the University of Michigan where one of his older brothers, Stillman W. Robinson, was a faculty member. He graduated there in 1869, and two years later he earned a Master of Science degree. In 1900 he was awarded a Doctor of Laws degree.

== Railroad career ==
While studying for his advanced degrees, Robinson worked for the St. Joseph and Denver City Railroad in 1869 and 1870. He began his employment with the Atchison, Topeka and Santa Fe Railway on April 1, 1871. Robinson took on many railroad building challenges for the Santa Fe, and under his guidance, the railroad built nearly 5,000 miles of track, including the connection from Topeka, Kansas, to Chicago, Illinois, and the railroad's expansion into Texas and New Mexico before he resigned in 1893.

In 1893, when the Santa Fe entered receivership, he was the popular choice among the railroad's employees to become president. But it was Joseph Reinhart, whose connections in the financial industry played a more important role, who became the Santa Fe's president. Robinson resigned from the Santa Fe to take the presidency of the Mexican Central Railway instead. This move may have been the best for Robinson after all as the Santa Fe struggled to regain solvency for the next year and as the press placed the blame for the railroad's collapse squarely on Reinhart.

He died in Topeka on November 7, 1918.
