= Joseph Reinhart =

American businessman

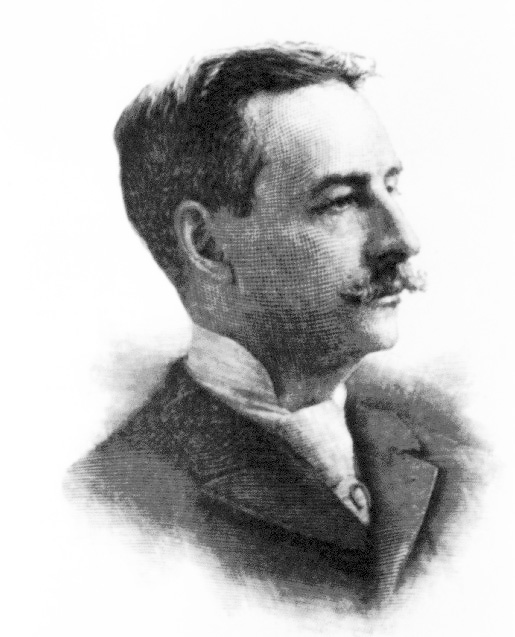
Joseph W. Reinhart

Joseph W. Reinhart (1851–1911) was an American businessman who served as the twelfth president of the Atchison, Topeka and Santa Fe Railway. He was head of the Santa Fe from December 1893 until August 1894.

== Biography ==
=== Early years ===
Joseph W. Reinhart was born in Pittsburgh, Pennsylvania on September 15, 1851. He was a graduate of Western University of Pennsylvania, today known as the University of Pittsburgh.

=== Career ===
Following graduation, Reinhart entered the field of railroad management, beginning in 1875 as a clerk in the office of a division superintendent of the Allegheny Valley Railroad. Thus began a career in which Reinhart worked for more than 20 railroads.

Reinhart ascended to the Santa Fe's presidency on December 23, 1893, when he was appointed a receiver of the railroad along with John J. McCook and Joseph C. Wilson. He had competed for the presidency with Albert Alonzo Robinson, the railroad's vice president and general manager, but Reinhart's connections in financial circles made him the ultimate winner of this battle.

Reinhart's own statements to the press in the previous year about the railroad's financial health would prove to be his downfall. Right up until he announced the receivership, Reinhart had been issuing reports of a highly profitable financial situation. He pointed out that the railroad's revenues for the fiscal year ending June 30, 1893, were more than $16 million, which was $1 million more than the previous year. However, with that amount in revenues, the railroad was barely able to cover the interest on its debts and collapsed with the death of its chairman George C. Magoun.

The press needed someone to blame and quickly centered on Reinhart as the issuer of the glowing statements of solvency as little as six months previous. Investigations were begun and it was soon found that executives in as many as the past seven years had juggled the company's accounts so that by the summer of 1894, the railroad's actual debt in the previous years had at least equalled its revenues, leaving the company's net worth at zero. Reinhart vehemently denied these new reports, but after further posturing and an indictment for violating the Interstate Commerce Act, Reinhart resigned from the railroad on August 8, 1894.

=== Death and legacy ===
Reinhart died at his home in Kansas City, Missouri on January 27, 1911. He was 59 years old at the time of his death, which was attributed to pneumonia and bronchitis which followed a severe cold which he caught in New York City two weeks previously.

At the time of his death, Reinhart was serving as the President of the Kansas City Viaduct and Terminal Company.

== Footnotes ==
Preceded by Allen Manvel	President of the Atchison, Topeka and Santa Fe Railway; 1893 – 1894	Succeeded by Aldace F. Walker
