= Samuel Read Hall =

American educator (1795–1877)

- Born: October 27, 1795; Croydon, New Hampshire
- Died: June 24, 1877 (aged 81); Brownington, Vermont
- Occupations: Educator, pastor
- Years active: 1814–1875
- Known for: Leader in school reform movement

Samuel Read Hall (October 27, 1795 – June 24, 1877) was an American educator.

== Life ==
He was born in Croydon, New Hampshire, the son of a clergyman. When he was three years old, his family moved to Guildhall, Vermont. Samuel was home-schooled and never attended a college. In 1814, he was employed as a teacher in Rumford, Maine. He studied to become a minister in Meriden, New Hampshire, and gained his license in 1823. He became the principal at an academy in Fitchburg, Massachusetts in 1822.

In 1823, he started the first normal school, or school for training of teachers and educators, in the United States. Subsequently, he ran the institution, located in Concord, Vermont, until 1830. He helped found the American Institute of Instruction in 1829, the oldest educational association in the U.S. In 1830, he accepted the invitation to lead the newly formed English Academy & Teachers Seminary, part of Phillips Academy at Andover, Massachusetts. At Andover, in addition to leading what was the second teacher training program in the United States, he also published training manuals and school textbooks and played a leading role in the school reform movement. From 1837 to 1840, he ran a teachers' seminary in Plymouth, New Hampshire. At an academy in Craftsbury, Vermont, he then established a teacher's department, which he ran until 1846. He served as pastor in Brownington and Granby, Vermont from 1846 to 1875.

He died in Brownington, Vermont, and is buried in Pleasant View Cemetery.

The house in which he lived in Brownington from 1856 to 1877 is now part of the Brownington Village Historic District.

== Philosophy ==
He recommended that children studying geography first study their local surroundings and progressively expand outwards to town, state, country, then world.

In his Lectures on School Keeping, he points out significant obstacles to the instruction of children in the American schools of 1829:

1. Lack of simple display media such as a globe of the world. (He is credited with inventing the blackboard, and the blackboard eraser)
2. Political factions within the school district, at war with each other at the expense of educational progress.
3. Wealthy citizens sending their children to private schools.
4. Schools exact no moral influence, in turn becoming a school for bad behavior.
5. Poorly qualified teachers.
6. Poor remuneration of qualified teachers.
7. Poor quality of textbooks, or lack of fitness for learning capacity of student.

== Awards and honors ==
- The library at Lyndon State College is named after him. The Samuel Read Hall Library at LSC.
- The Samuel Read Hall Building at Plymouth State University is named after him.
- Shadow Lake, Concord Vermont, once formally known as “Hall’s Pond” was named after him.
- Halls Brooke, Concord, Vermont is still named after him

== Partial bibliography ==
- Instructor's Manual, or Lectures on School Keeping, Boston, 1829.
- Lectures to Female Teachers on School-keeping, Boston, 1832.
- Lectures to School-Masters on Teaching, Boston, 1833.
- The Arithmetical Manual, Andover, 1832.
- The Child's Assistant to a Knowledge of the Geography and History of Vermont, Vermont, 1827.
