= González–Álvarez House =

Historic house in Florida, United States

- U.S. National Register of Historic Places
- U.S. National Historic Landmark
- U.S. National Historic Landmark District – Contributing property
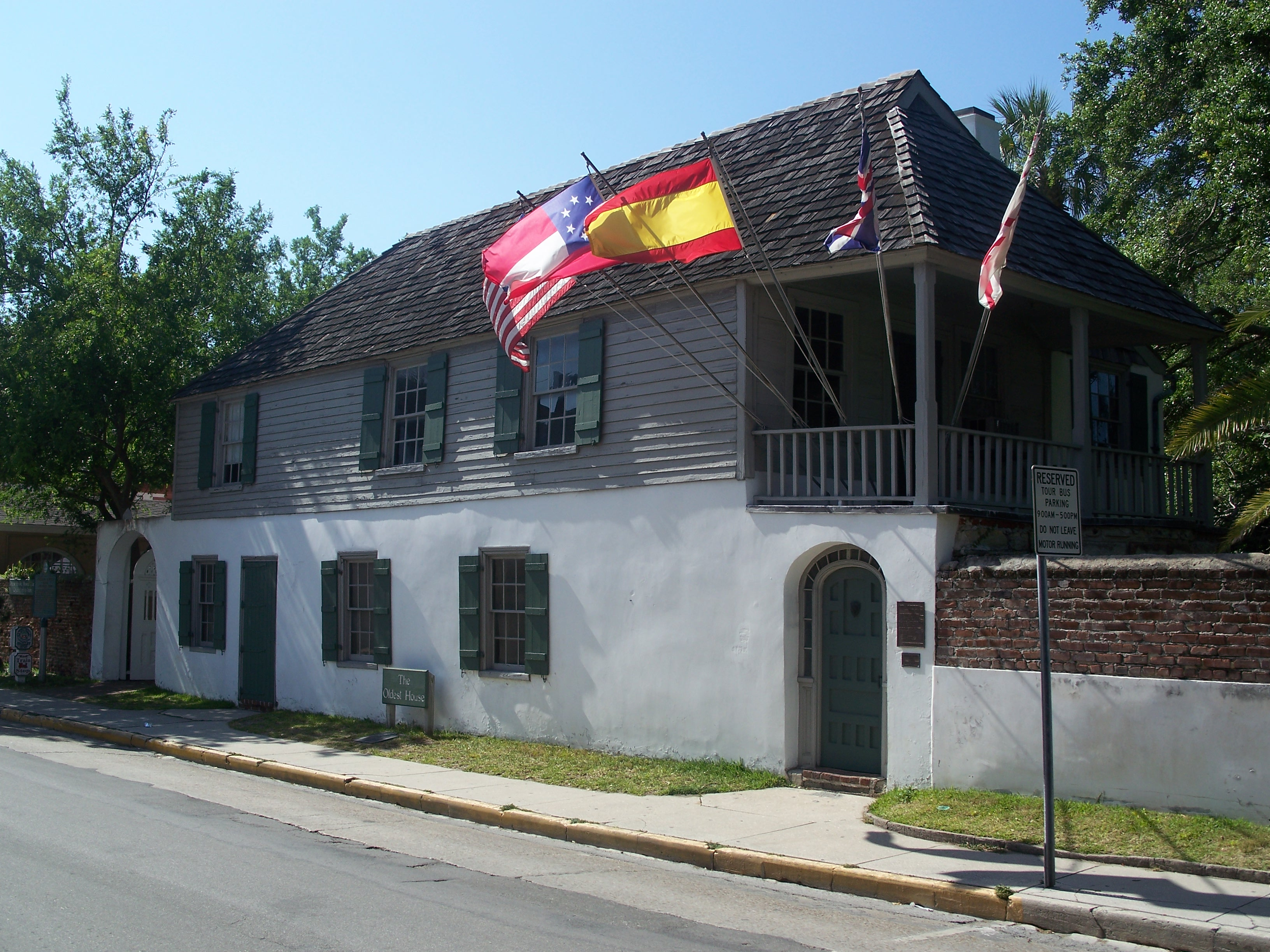

- Location within Florida Location within the United States
- Interactive map showing the location of Gonzalez-Alvarez House
- Location: 14 St. Francis St., St. Augustine, Florida
- Coordinates: 29°53′17″N 81°18′36″W
- Area: 2 acres (0.81 ha)
- Built: circa 1723, 1775–1786, 1790
- Architectural style: Stone Vernacular
- Part of: St. Augustine Town Plan Historic District (ID70000847)
- NRHP reference No.: 70000845

Significant dates
- Added to NRHP: April 15, 1970
- Designated NHL: April 15, 1970
- Designated NHLDCP: April 15, 1970

The González–Álvarez House, also known as The Oldest House, is a historic house museum at 14 St. Francis Street in St. Augustine, Florida. With a construction history dating to about 1723, it is believed to be the oldest surviving house in St. Augustine. It is also an important example of St. Augustine's Spanish colonial architectural style, with later modifications by English owners. It was designated a U.S. National Historic Landmark in 1970. The house is now owned by the St. Augustine Historical Society and is open for public tours as part of the Oldest House Museum Complex. Evidence can be seen of the Spanish, British, and American occupations of St. Augustine.

== Description and history ==
The González–Álvarez House is located in a residential area south of downtown St. Augustine, on the north side of St. Francis Street between Charlotte and Marine Streets. It is a two-story structure, its first floor built of coquina and its upper level framed in wood with a clapboarded exterior. It is covered by a hip roof finished with wooden shingles. The building is reflective of multiple periods of alteration and enlargement, during different periods of colonial administration.

The land on which this house stands has been occupied since the 17th century, when a building is documented to have been standing here. The present house's earliest period of construction dates to about 1723, when the first floor was built, and it was documented as being occupied by Tomás González y Hernández, an artilleryman at the Castillo de San Marcos, and his family. The design of this house is one that was adopted by Spanish colonial settlers to deal with local living conditions and available building materials. It was built of readily available coquina limestone, with its main thick walls oriented east–west, and has an open covered loggia on the east side. The latter allows prevailing southeasterly winds to cool the structure, while the thick walls provide insulation from hot weather. The interior floors are made of tabby concrete.

After the British took over Florida in 1763, the González family left for Cuba. In 1774 the house was purchased by Major Joseph Peavett, an Englishman, who added the wood-frame second story, and put glass windows into openings previously only enclosed by wooden shutters. It was further enlarged by the third owner, Geronimo Alvarez, who added a two-story wing built of coquina. The house was taken over by the St. Augustine Historical Society in 1918, which undertook its restoration to a late 19th-century appearance in 1959–60, reversing a number of intervening alterations.

== List of families who lived in the oldest house ==
- First Spanish period
  - 1625–1763, family of Tomas González y Hernández & María Francisco de Guevara
- British period and second Spanish period
  - 1775–1790, Joseph Peavett & Maria Evans
- Second Spanish period and into statehood
  - 1790–1882, Family of Gerónimo Álvarez & Antonia Vens
  - 1882–1918, William B. Duke family (1882–1884), Mary Carver and Dr. Charles P. Carver (1884–1898), James W. Henderson family (1898–1911), George T. Reddington and the South Beach Alligator Farm 1911–1918
  - 1918–present, St. Augustine Historical Society

== Gallery ==
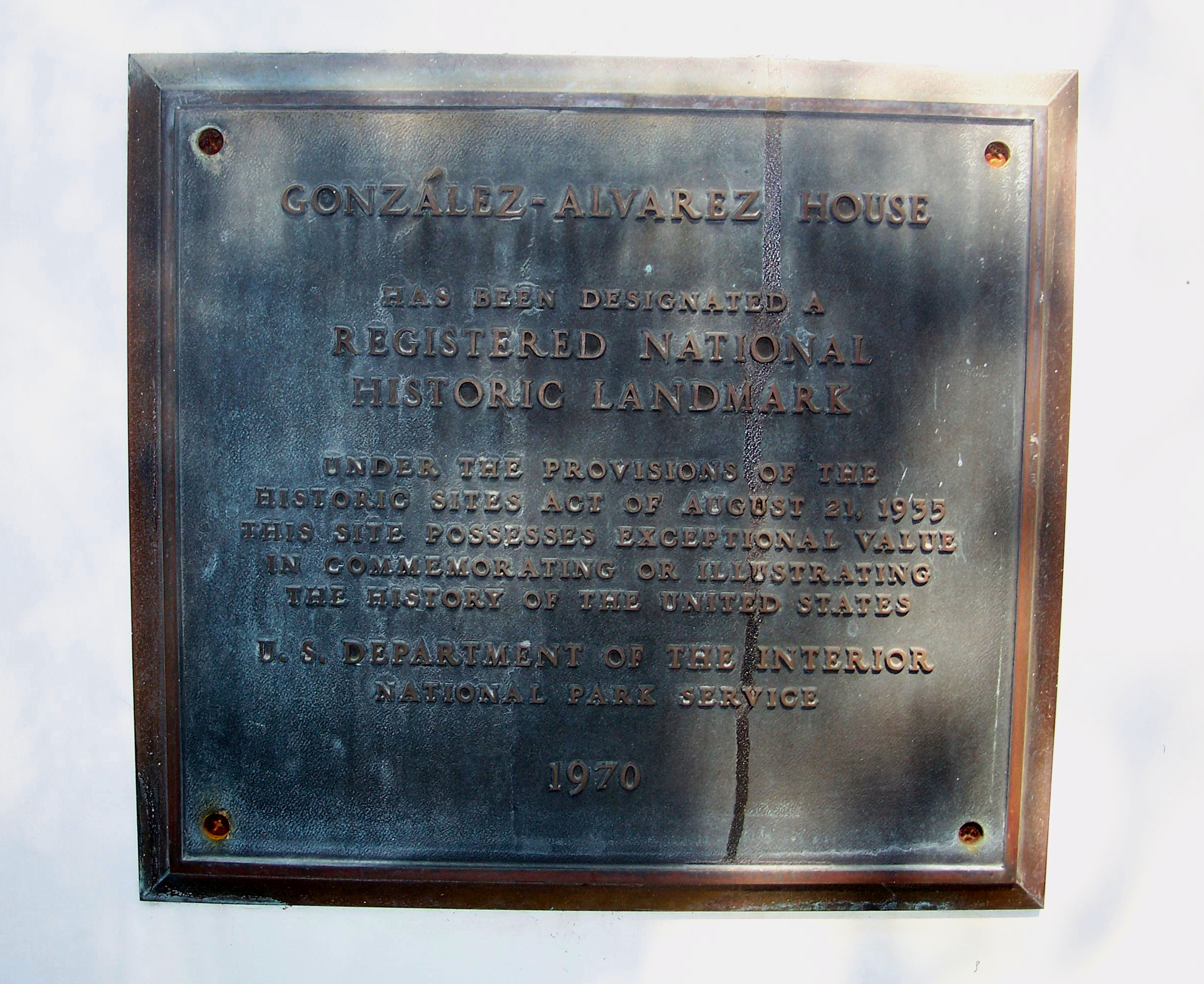
National Historic Landmark plaque

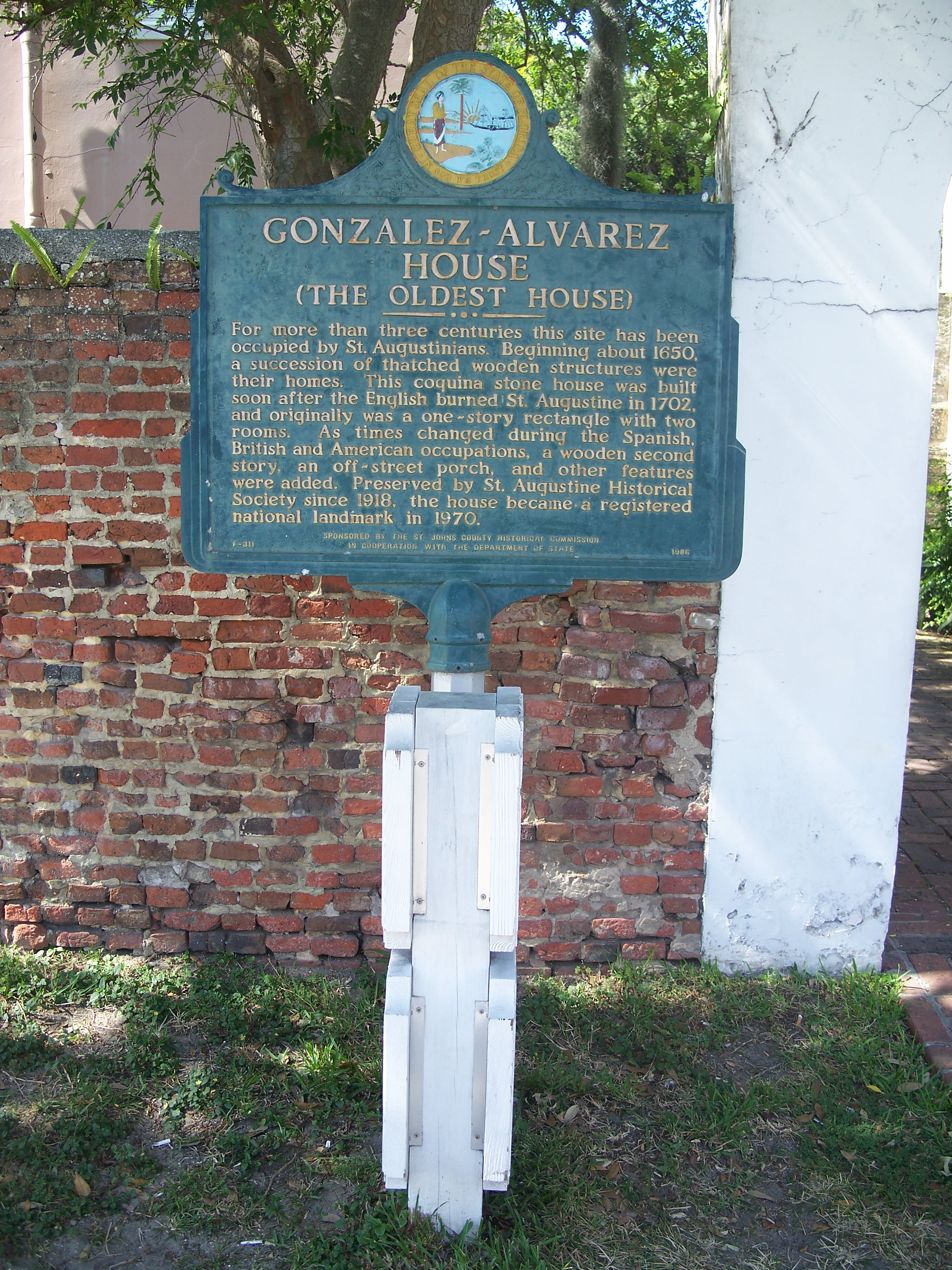
Historical marker

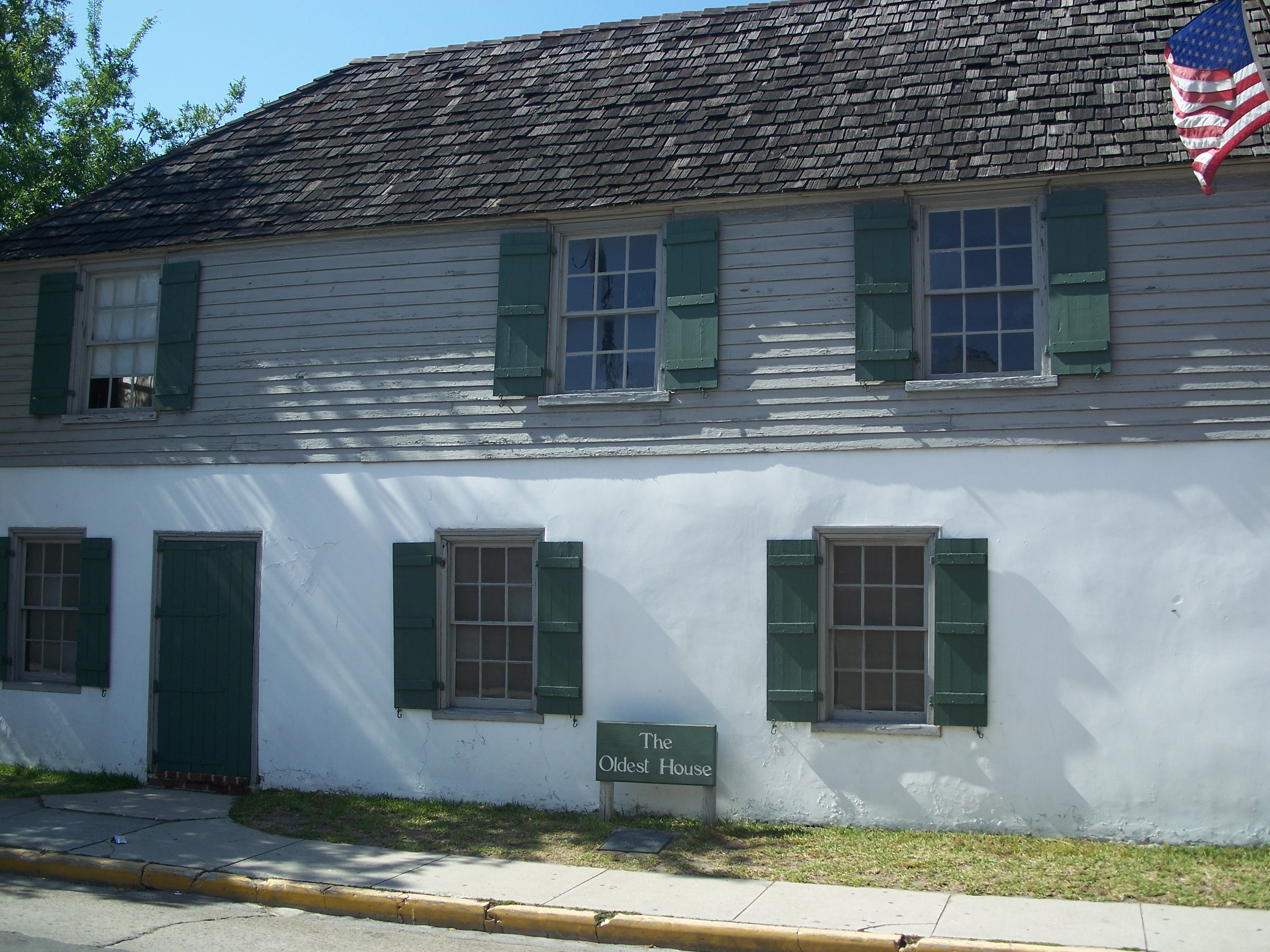

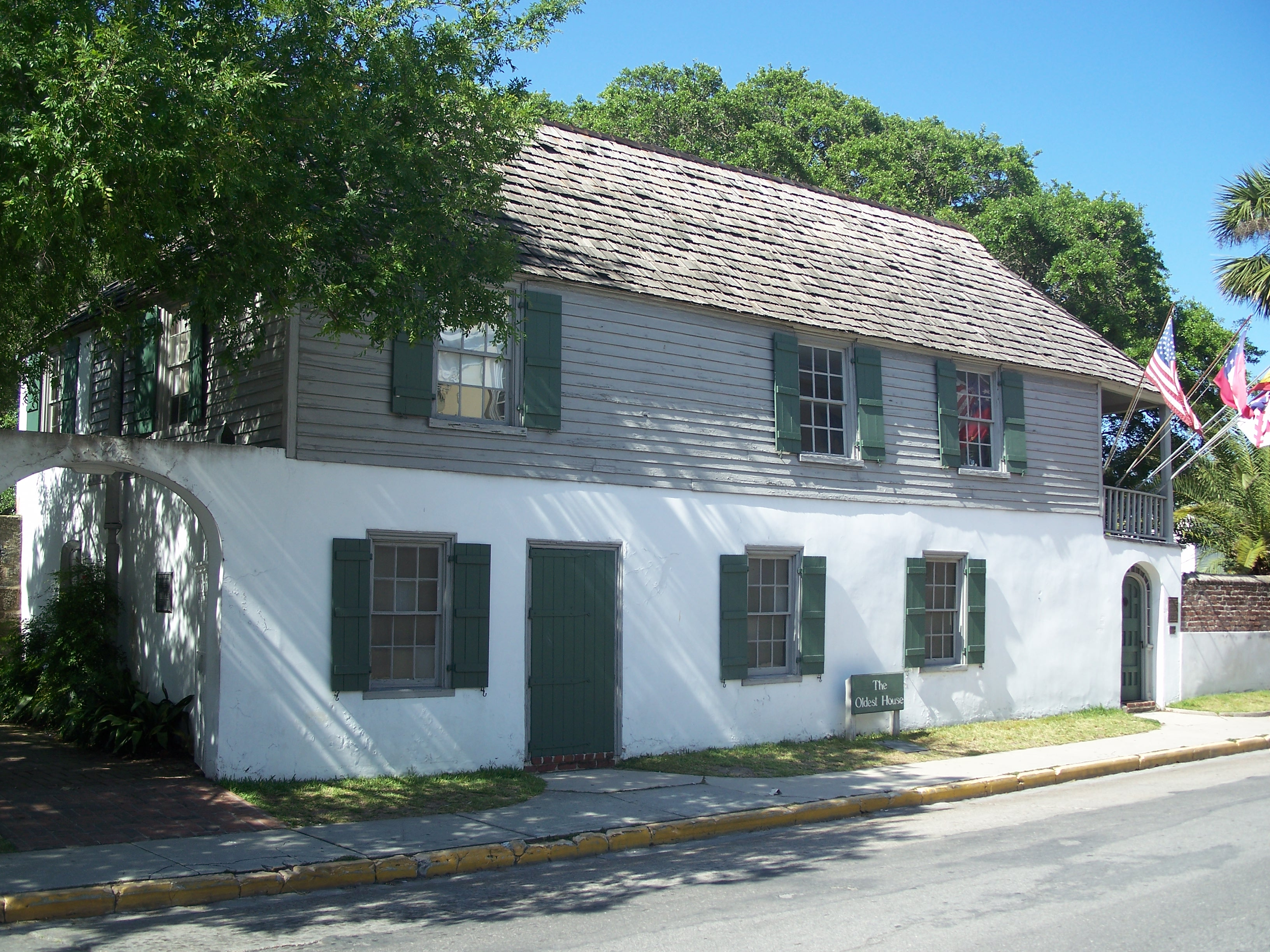

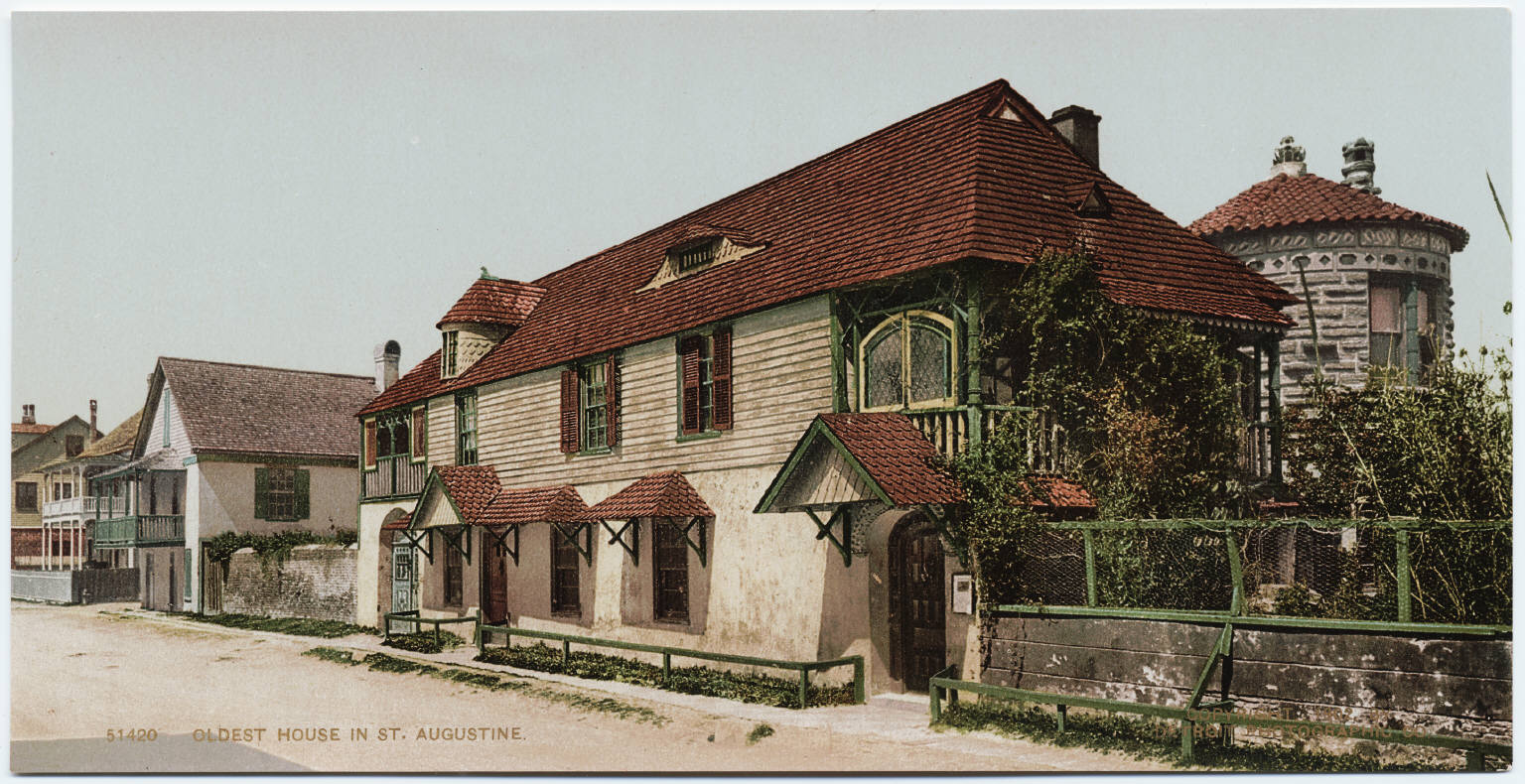
c. 1902
