= James Strong (college president) =

American theologian and scholar

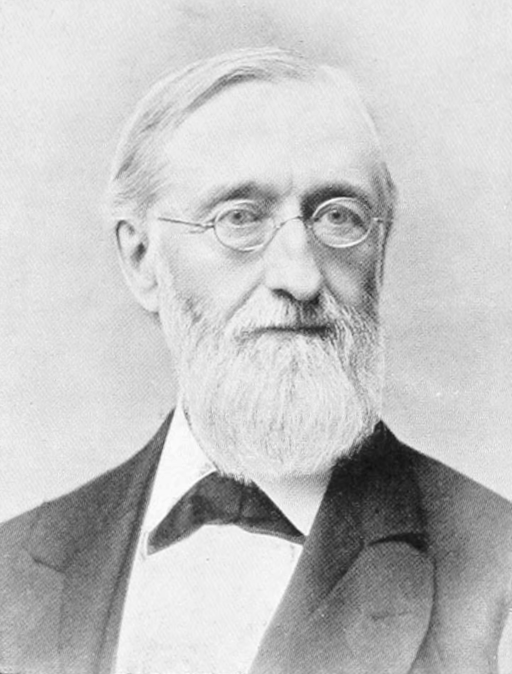

1st President of Carleton College
- In office 1870–1903
- Succeeded by: William Henry Sallmon

Personal details
- Born: September 29, 1833 Brownington, Vermont, U.S.
- Died: February 24, 1913 (aged 79) Northfield, Minnesota, U.S.
- Education: Beloit College; Union Theological Seminary

James Woodward Strong (September 29, 1833 - February 24, 1913), an American theologian and scholar, was the first president of Carleton College, Minnesota. Despite lifelong illness and injury, Strong was a highly active man throughout his life, juggling multiple professional and personal occupations.

== Biography ==
Strong was born on September 29, 1833, in Brownington, Vermont, one of three sons of Elijah Gridley Strong and Sarah Ashley Partridge. Despite ill health as a child, James began his working life at the age of fourteen with a yearlong assistantship in a printing office. He followed this service with two years in the Burlington bookstore of Edward Smith, during which time he also began studying Latin, a critical element of advanced study in a 19th-century education. At the age of 17, Strong took a position teaching school in a mountain school district, the start of his professional life in academia.

In 1851, he accompanied his family to Beloit, Wisconsin, where his parents opened the old Beloit House as a temperance hotel. On arrival there, James enrolled in the preparatory department of the Beloit Academy, continuing as a student in the college department in 1854. He graduated at the head of his class in 1858. During his years of study he also taught in local schools, and in 1856 was chosen Beloit's first superintendent of schools. He also served as secretary of the State Teacher's Association and of the Library Association. He had also learned telegraphy during his time in Beloit, in 1853 taking charge of the local railway telegraph office. Strong brought his younger brother William to assist him in that office, launching William's career in the railroad business. (William would eventually become president of the Atchison, Topeka, & Santa Fe Railroad.) In 1858, James served in the telegraph office in Madison, and at the same time he was a legislative reporter for Milwaukee newspapers.

In 1859, Strong began study at Union Theological Seminary in New York. His eyesight having become quite poor, his classmate Eugene Avery read lecture notes to him for his first two years. Strong married Mary Davenport in Beloit on September 3, 1861. Mary's help reading texts was invaluable and enabled him to complete his work and graduate from the seminary in 1862. Strong would rely on Mary for such help for the rest of his professional life.

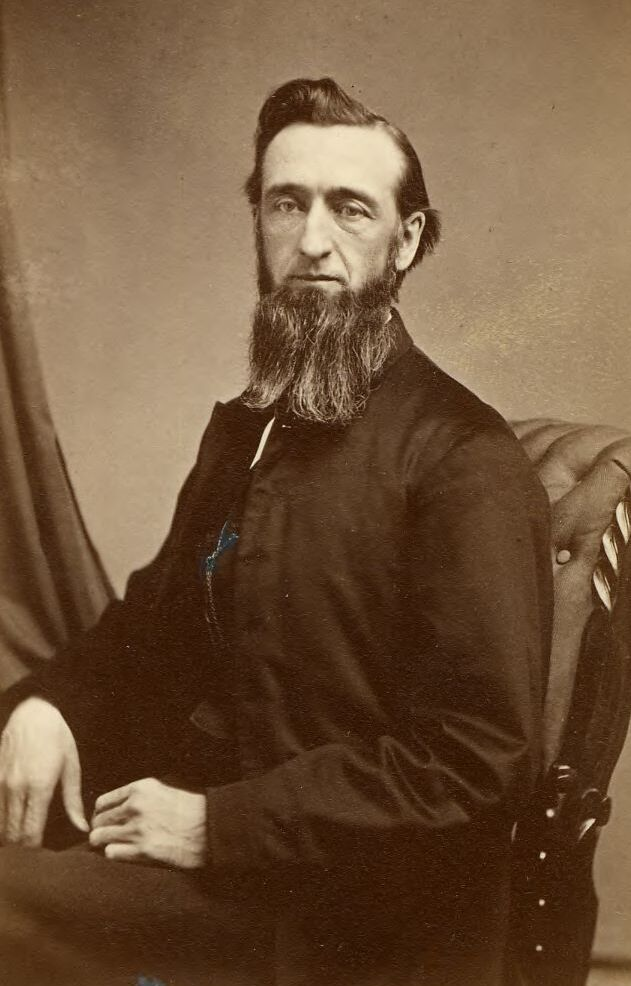
Strong in 1871

Ordained as Congregationalist minister, he preached first in Brodhead, Wisconsin for two years, and then in Faribault, Minnesota beginning in 1865. The Congregational Church in Minnesota had established a college in the nearby town of Northfield in 1866, and in 1870, Strong was invited to become its first president. Initially, Strong declined the position, since the college's outlook seemed poor. Northfield College had few students in its preparatory academy, and up until that fall, no students in its college department. It was operating out of an old hotel, the construction of its new building stalled due to inadequate materials and a lack of funds. The trustees were convinced Strong was the man to provide the leadership to improve the college's reputation and financial status, so they made him a more generous offer and this time he accepted.

Strong's first challenge was to secure adequate funding for the school. He travelled to Boston to seek contributors. While riding with an acquaintance, a Mr. White, the carriage in which they rode was struck by an express train. White was killed outright, and Strong suffered serious injuries. News spread that Strong had been killed. Strong had recently visited William Carleton, a wealthy manufacturer in Charlestown, Massachusetts, and Carleton and his companion Susan Willis had promised a contribution of $1,500 and a new piano. Upon learning of Strong's seemingly miraculous escape from death, Carleton was reportedly so moved that he concluded Strong had been saved for some greater purpose. Carleton thereupon made a donation to the college of $50,000, the largest contribution to a western college at the time. The grateful trustees of the college renamed the school in Carleton's honor.

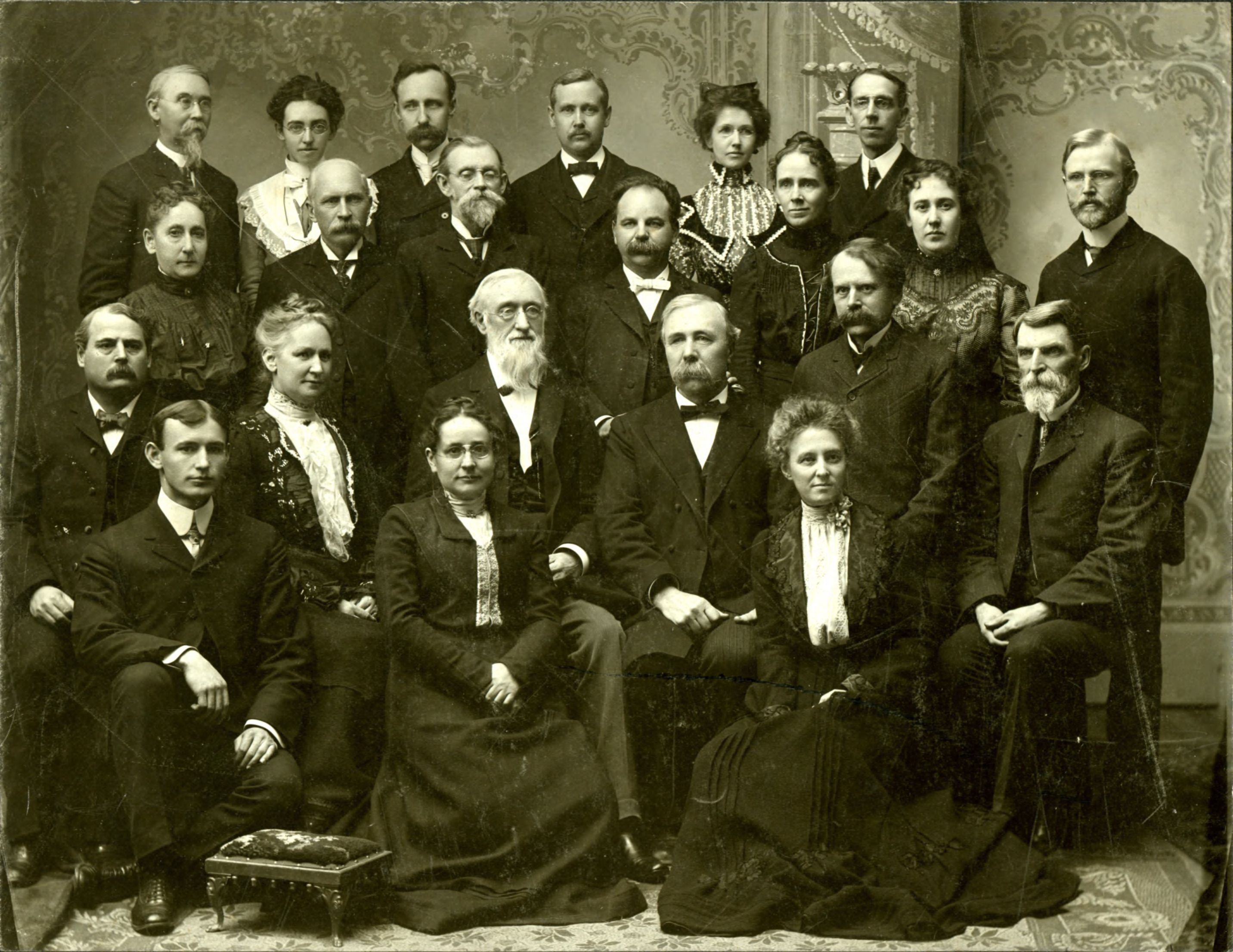
Strong and the faculty of Carleton College, 1902

Strong's tenure as President of Carleton College lasted over three decades. Under his leadership, the college's endowment, campus, faculty, and student body all grew considerably, and Carleton ranked among the foremost colleges of the upper Midwest. He retired in 1903.

Dr. Strong was active in the Congregational Church, serving in almost every National Council from 1865 onward. He served as president of the Congregational Home Missionary Society of Minnesota from 1872 to 1895.

Strong died in his sleep at his home in Northfield on February 24, 1913.
