= American Institute of Instruction =

The American Institute of Instruction was formed in Boston on August 21, 1830 during a meeting of over two hundred persons representing eleven states. The Institute was the first long-lived interstate association of teachers and other persons interested in the cause of education in the United States. The society met for a convention once a year, usually in August, lasting three to five days and consisting mostly of lectures and discussions. Women were invited to attend lectures and committee reports, but were not allowed to become active members until 1868. The institute's original purpose was to secure a Massachusetts Superintendent of Common Schools. Due to the work of Samuel Read Hall, George B. Emerson and E. A. Andrews, legislation was passed leading to both the appointment of Horace Mann as Secretary of the State Board of Education, and the Acts of 1837, providing for a Superintendent of Public Education.
