= Alexander Twilight =

American politician (1795–1857)

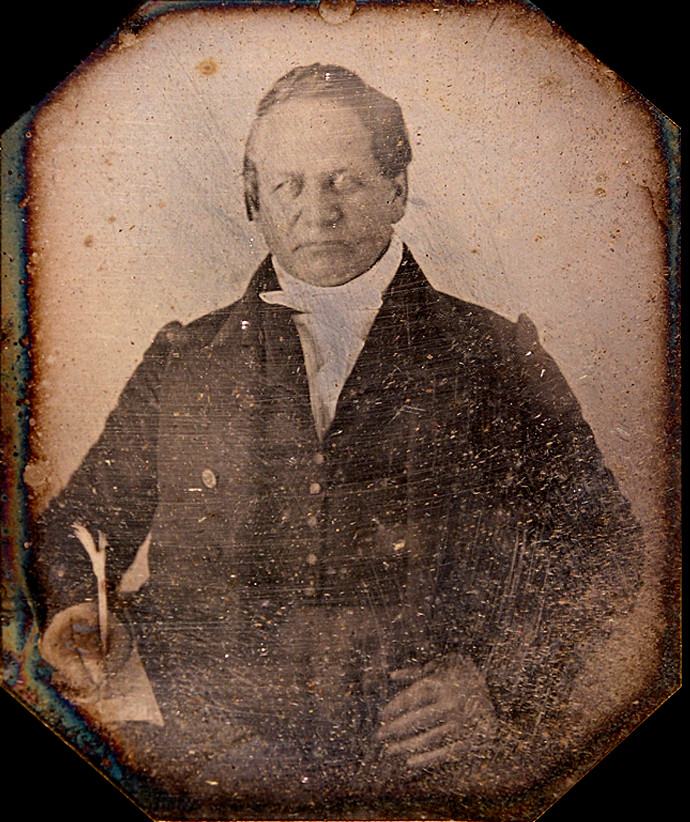

Member of the Vermont House of Representatives from Brownington
- In office 1836–1837
- Preceded by: Gilbert Gross
- Succeeded by: Jeremiah Huntoon

Personal details
- Born: September 23, 1795 Corinth, Vermont, U.S.
- Died: June 19, 1857 (aged 61) Brownington, Vermont, U.S.
- Party: Whig
- Spouse: Mercy Ladd Merrill
- Education: Middlebury College
- Profession: Minister (Christianity); Schoolmaster

Alexander Lucius Twilight (September 23, 1795 – June 19, 1857) was an American educator, minister and politician. He was recognized as the first African American to have earned a bachelor's degree from an American college or university, graduating from Middlebury College in 1823. He was ordained as a Congregational minister and worked in education and ministry all his career. In 1829, Twilight became principal of the Orleans County Grammar School. There he designed and built Athenian Hall, the first granite public building in the state of Vermont. In 1836, he was the first African American elected as a state legislator, serving in the Vermont House of Representatives; he was also the only African American ever elected to a state legislature before the Civil War.

His house and Athenian Hall are included in the Brownington Village Historic District, listed on the National Register of Historic Places (NRHP).

== African-American roots ==
Alexander's father, Ichabod, was born in Boston, July 1765. Ichabod's father was black, his mother, white, possibly an indentured servant. Eventually, Ichabod married Mary, described as 'white' or 'light-skinned,' implying she was of partial African descent.

Ichabod and Mary were free and mixed race, of African and English descent. It is unknown if they were born free; they were likely descendants of enslaved Africans and English settlers. Ichabod was a Revolutionary War veteran from New Hampshire. His parents were both listed in the Corinth, Vermont town history as "the first negroes to settle in Corinth where they bought property, moving from Bradford on November 28, 1798.

== Early life and education ==
Alexander Lucius Twilight was born September 23, 1795, in Bradford, Vermont. Starting around 1802 when he was eight years old, Twilight worked for a neighboring farmer in Corinth. Working from an early age was typical of working-class children of his era. For the next 12 years he read, studied, and learned mathematics while working in various farm labor positions.

Twilight enrolled in Randolph's Orange County Grammar School in 1815 at the age of 20. From 1815 to 1821, he completed all the institution's secondary school courses as well as the first two years of a college-level curriculum. He enrolled in Middlebury College in 1821, where he graduated in 1823 with a Bachelor of Arts degree. He was the first known African American to receive a degree from an American institution of higher learning. This did not become widely known until 1826, when Amherst College awarded a bachelor's degree to Edward Jones and claimed that he was the first African-American college graduate, which prompted Middlebury College to publicize Twilight's earlier graduation.

== Career ==
Twilight's first job was teaching in Peru, New York. He also studied for the ministry with the Congregational Church and served several Congregational churches. He occasionally led worship services and delivered sermons. The Champlain Presbytery of Plattsburgh licensed him to preach. Twilight taught for four years in Peru, then moved to Vergennes, Vermont, in 1828 to teach during the week and hold weekend church services in Waltham and Ferrisburg.

In 1829, Twilight was hired as principal of the Orleans County, Vermont, Grammar School in Brownington, the only secondary school in a two-county area, where he was also ordained as minister of the Congregational Church. He built a house for his family shortly after arrival, which still stands and is the headquarters of the Orleans County Historical Society.

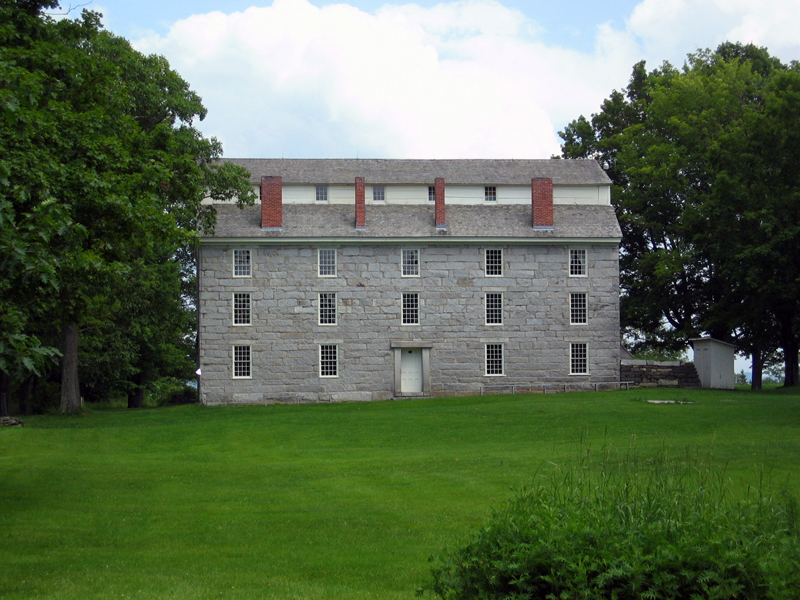
Athenian Hall, now better known as The Old Stone House

Wanting to create a residence dormitory to accommodate out of town students, from 1834 to 1836, Twilight designed, raised funds for, and had built a massive four-story granite building which he called Athenian Hall. The first granite public building in Vermont, it served as a dormitory for the co-educational school, also known as the Brownington Academy. Both his home and Athenian Hall are today part of a historic district listed on the National Register of Historic Places.

In 1836, Twilight was elected to the newly established Vermont House of Representatives (Vermont's legislature was unicameral, consisting only of the House until 1836), becoming the first African American to be elected to a state legislature. As a member of the House, he worked unsuccessfully to persuade the Vermont General Assembly not to divide school funding between Brownington and nearby Craftsbury, which had decided to open its own school.

He left his job as headmaster in 1847, apparently after a falling out with the Brownington school's trustees. He taught school in Shipton and Hatley, Quebec. Without Twilight's leadership, the school in Brownington experienced declining enrollment, and it was closed in 1852. Persuaded to return to Brownington, Twilight resumed his duties as principal and pastor. He resigned as pastor in 1853, and continued as principal until 1855.

== Death and burial ==
In October 1855, Twilight suffered a stroke which left him partially paralyzed and caused him to retire as principal of the Brownington school. He died on June 19, 1857, and was buried at the Congregational church in Brownington.

== Marriage and family ==
In 1826, Twilight married Mercy Ladd Merrill of Unity, New Hampshire. They remained married until his death, and had no children. Mercy Twilight died in 1878.

== Legacy and honors ==
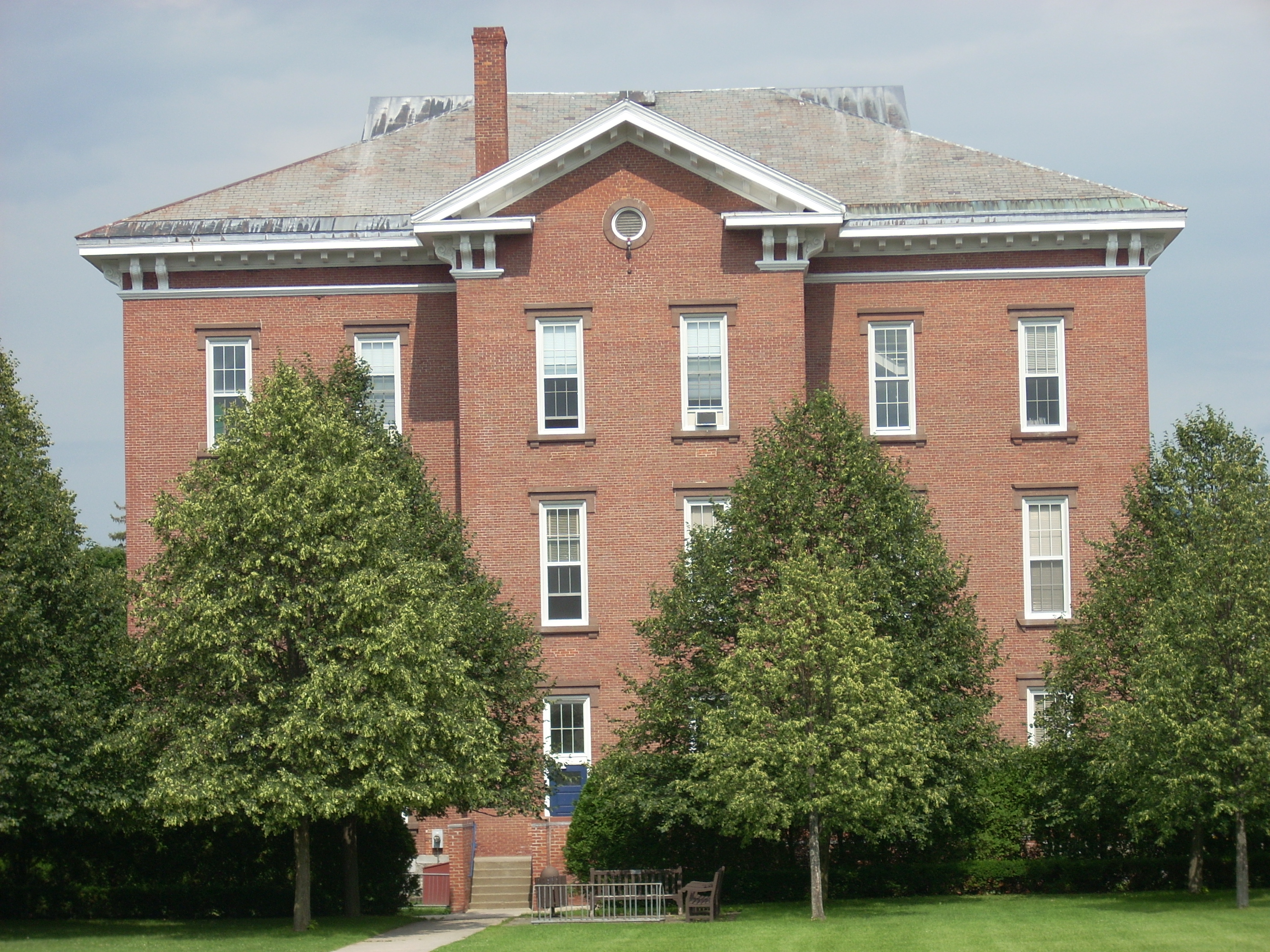
Alexander Twilight Hall at Middlebury College

- Alexander Twilight House (1830), still stands across the street from Athenian Hall. Today it serves as headquarters for the Orleans County Historical Society. It is within the Historic District listed on the National Register of Historic Places (NRHP).
- Athenian Hall (1834–36) is now operated by the Orleans County Historical Society as the Old Stone House Museum, and anchors the Historic District of Brownington. It was the first granite public building in Vermont.
- Alexander Twilight Hall at his alma mater Middlebury College was named in his honor.
- The Alexander Twilight Auditorium at Lyndon State College is named for Twilight.
- The Aspire Alexander Twilight College Preparatory Academy in Sacramento, California, was named for Twilight. It opened in the fall of 2009.
- The Twilight Awards, a special awards show to celebrate teachers, schools and education nonprofits were named for Twilight.
- Howard Frank Mosher wrote about the Stone House in Vermont Life Magazine, Autumn 1996:

I like the way the Stone House still looms up on that hilltop, where the wind blows all the time. There it sits, unshaken and monolithic, as I write this sentence and as you read it, every bit as astonishing today as the day it was completed. What a tribute to the faith of its creator, the Reverend Alexander Twilight: scholar, husband, teacher, preacher, legislator, father-away-from-home to nearly 3,000 boys and girls, an African American and a Vermonter of great vision, whose remains today lie buried in the church-yard just up the maple-lined dirt road from his granite school, in what surely was, and still is, one of the last best places anywhere.

- An official portrait of Alexander Twilight hangs in the Vermont State House.

== See also ==
- Timeline of African-American firsts
- List of African-American pioneers in desegregation of higher education
