= Vermont municipality =

Municipalities in Vermont, New England

A Vermont municipality is a particular type of New England municipality. It is the basic unit of local government.

== Background ==
Vermont contains 247 incorporated towns and cities. Ten are cities and 237 are towns. Collectively, these 247 municipalities cover the vast majority, but not all, of the state's territory. There are some unincorporated areas in the sparsely populated mountainous regions of the state. Most of the unincorporated areas are in Essex County, in the northeastern part of the state. Bennington, Windham and Chittenden counties also contain smaller amounts of unincorporated territory. This territory includes five unincorporated townships and 4 gores and grants. The remaining ten counties in the state are entirely incorporated (Bennington and Windham counties were also fully incorporated at one time, but lost that status when a town disincorporated). Fewer than 100 of the state's residents live in unincorporated areas.

== Incorporated villages ==
Vermont is one of three New England states to have any type of incorporated general-purpose municipality below the town level, namely incorporated villages. Connecticut has incorporated boroughs, and Maine has incorporated plantations. There are about 30 in the state. There were once nearly double that number.

== History ==
Early town organization in Vermont proceeded in a different manner from that of the other New England states. In these areas, towns were often "chartered" long before any settlers moved into a particular area. This was very common in the mid to late 18th century. Once there were enough residents in a town to formally organize a town government, no further action was necessary to incorporate. This practice can lead to inconsistencies in the dates of incorporation for towns in this region. Dates given in reference sources sometime reflect the date the town was chartered – which may have been long before it was even settled – not the date its town government actually became active. In other parts of New England, it was not unheard of for "future towns" to be laid out along these lines, but such areas would not be formally incorporated as towns until they were sufficiently settled to organize a town government.

There are far fewer cities in Vermont than there are towns. Across Vermont as a whole, only about 5% of all incorporated municipalities are cities. In early colonial times, all incorporated municipalities in Vermont were towns; there were no cities. Burlington, for instance, was chartered as a town as early as 1785, but the city of Burlington was not chartered until 1865, as Vermont's second city. For many years prior to the 1860s Vermont had just one city, which was the city of Vergennes, incorporated in 1788.

As in most of New England, population is not a determination in what makes a city or a town in Vermont. Rather, cities are formed when a town's residents choose to switch from a town meeting form to a city form. There are a number of towns that have larger populations than nearby cities.

== Structure ==
Local government in Vermont follows Dillon's Rule, which holds that municipal governments only have the powers that are expressly granted to them by Vermont or federal law, plus any powers that are necessarily implied by the express powers and any powers essential to the municipality's existence. Vermont is one of ten states that does not grant any measure of home rule to municipalities, and one of three "strict" Dillon's Rule states which impose particularly close limits on municipal power. With few exceptions, the powers of Vermont municipalities are narrowly construed. In most other New England states, the laws governing municipal authority are construed so broadly that they effectively have the form, if not the substance, of home rule.

Over time, some of the distinctions between a town and a city have become blurred. Since the early 20th century, towns have been allowed to modify the town meeting form of government in various ways (e.g., representative town meeting, adding a town manager).

=== Villages ===
Incorporated villages remain a part of their parent town, but assume some responsibilities for municipal services within their boundaries. They are typically regarded as less important than towns. In recent decades, many villages have disincorporated, reverting to full town control.

The term "village" is sometimes used in Vermont to describe a distinct, built-up place within a town or city. This may be a "town center" which bears the same name as the town or city (almost every town has such a place), or a name related to that of the town, or a completely unrelated name. The town of Brownington, for example, includes "villages" called Evansville, Brownington, and Brownington Center.

These "villages" are not incorporated municipalities and should not be understood as such. Towns do sometimes grant a certain measure of recognition to such areas, using highway signs that identify them as "villages", for example. These informal "villages" also sometimes correspond to underlying special-purpose districts such as fire or water districts, which are separately incorporated quasi-municipal entities that provide specific services within a part of a town (in Maine and New Hampshire, the term "village corporation" is used for a type of special-purpose district). Many villages also are recognized as places by the United States Postal Service (some villages have their own post offices, with their names used in mailing addresses) or the United States Census Bureau (which recognizes some villages as census-designated places and tabulates census data for them). For an example of the latter, see Barton Village, which is a constituent part of the town of Barton. But they have no existence as general-purpose municipalities separate from the town (if they even have any legal existence at all), and are usually regarded by local residents as a part of the town in which they are located, less important than the whole.

It is possible for a Vermont village to become a city. In Vermont, if a village becomes a city, it does not continue to overlay its parent town, but breaks away and becomes a completely separate municipality. Most cities in Vermont today are actually former villages rather than former towns, and are much smaller than a typical town in terms of land area. The above process has created several instances where there are adjacent towns and cities with the same name. In all cases, the city was originally the "town center" of the town, but later incorporated as a city and became a separate municipality.

== Size ==
A typical town was laid out in a 6 by 6 miles (9.7 by 9.7 km) square. Each contained 36 sections, 1 mile (1.6 km) squares or 640 acres (260 ha). One section was reserved for the support of public schools. This was copied when the Continental Congress laid out Ohio 1785–7.

== Unorganized towns ==
Vermont contains some town-sized unorganized entities, referred to as "unorganized towns". Most of these are areas that were drawn up on maps in the 18th and 19th centuries as what might be termed "future towns", but never saw enough settlement to actually commence operation of a formal town government.

Essex County contains three unorganized towns which have never been actively incorporated. Their collective population in the 2000 Census was 41. There are no other unorganized towns in the state which have never been incorporated.

== Disincorporated towns ==
There were two unorganized towns which were once a town, but have disincorporated and reverted to unorganized territory, due to population loss.

The towns of Glastenbury and Somerset, located in the Green Mountains on opposite sides of the Bennington-Windham County line, disincorporated in 1937. In the 1940 Census, Glastenbury reported five residents, Somerset four. In only one census since then has the population of either reached double digits.

== See also ==
- List of municipalities in Vermont
