= Samuel Read Hall Library =

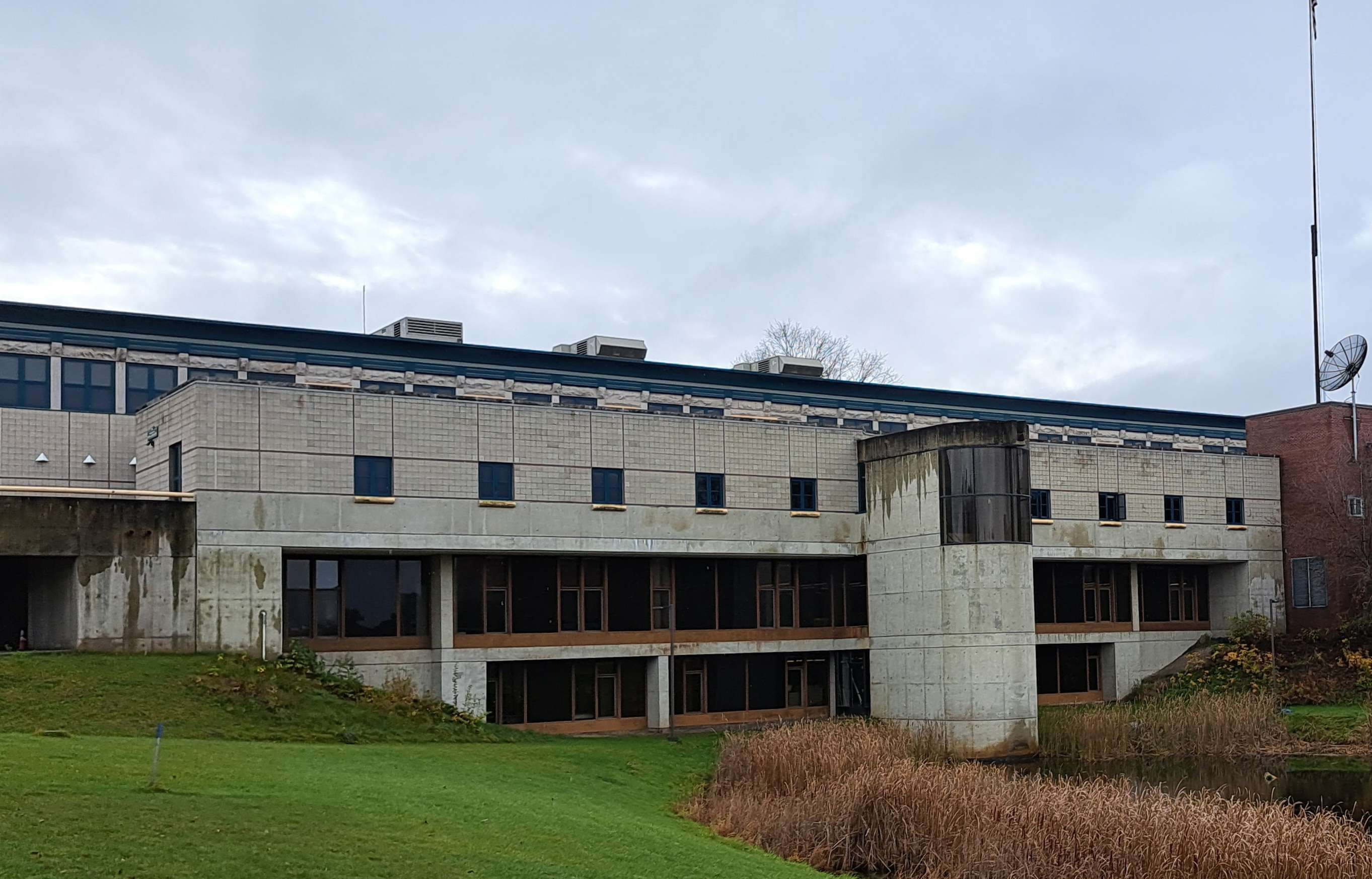
- North face of the library
- 44.534153°N 72.024565°W
- Location: Lyndon Center
- Established: 1972

Collection
- Size: 113,000 volumes

Other information
- Director: Sam Boss
- Website: https://libraries.northernvermont.edu/

The Samuel Read Hall Library is the library at Lyndon State College, a member of the Vermont State College system. The library is named for Samuel Read Hall, an educational pioneer and native Vermonter and is located in the Library Academic Center on the college's campus in Lyndon Center.

== Library history ==
When Lyndon State College relocated to its new home on the top of Vail Hill in 1951, the library that had been at the nearby Lyndon Institute (where the college began as a teacher education program) was moved to Vail Manor and housed in one of the mansion's twin towers. Twelve thousand volumes were moved by hand in one weekend. In 1965, the library expanded into its own building in what is now the Harvey Academic Center. Lyndon Professor Emeritus and Vermont state senator Graham S. Newell selected Samuel Read Hall as the library's namesake. In 1972, the current library building was opened, and in 1980, the building won a design award from the American Institute of Architects for being a “bridge” from one side of campus to the other. By 1994, however, the library and the college had both outgrown their space, and so the decision was made to expand the library building into what would become known as the Library Academic Center, or LAC. The renovated building, which opened in 1995, added one floor of library space and one floor of classrooms.

== Resources ==
The Samuel Read Hall library now occupies 29,239 square feet (2,716.4 m^{2}) and is home to 113,000 volumes, including books, CDs, DVDs, reference books, archival information, curriculum material, audiobooks, maps and games. The library subscribes to 25 periodical databases, with approximately 71,000 searches run annually.

Within the library, there are several areas designated for specific groups or courses of study. The first floor is home to the Center for Rural Students, the periodical archives and the current print periodicals. The second floor houses the majority of the book collection, the Senator Graham S. Newell Vermont room, the Vermont Room historical collection, the college archives, the children's collection, a computer lab, the Information Technology department, and the Instructional Materials Center, which contains teaching resources for students entering the education field.

The Graham Newell Vermont Room is available for use as a meeting or conference room, and an adjoining room known as the Vermont Room contains a collection of materials relating to the state's history and, in particular, the three counties of the Northeast Kingdom: Caledonia, Essex, and Orleans. These include town reports, books, newspapers, geological guides, laws, and more. The library is also home to the college archives, including yearbooks, photographs, student newspapers and other material related to the history of the college.

The LSC Academic Support Center is found on the third floor of the library, along with the reference collection, the Casual Reading Collection and audio and visual media, including CDs, DVDs, VHS tapes, records and audiobooks.

There are four group study rooms distributed around the library.

== Art ==
The Samuel Read Hall library is home to several pieces of art and sculpture. A replica of the Winged Victory of Samothrace sculpture can be found in the reading area on the third floor. This nearly 8-foot (2.4 m) statue is a plaster copy of the original, which was discovered in 1863 on the Greek island of Samothrace. The original is believed to have been created between 300 and 100 B.C. to honor Nike, goddess of victory and messenger of Zeus and Athena. When originally recovered on Samothrace, the head and arms were not found with the other pieces of the statue , which was in fragments. The right hand was found in 1951 and later reunited with the rest of the original statue, but the copy owned by the library was crafted before the discovery of the hand. The statue is on permanent loan from the Cobleigh Library in Lyndonville, the home of Lyndon State College. Theodore Vail, then-president of AT&T and the historic owner of the land that Lyndon State College is on, donated the sculpture to Cobleigh in 1906 during the dedication of the library. The library staff at Cobleigh decided to loan the statue to the Samuel Read Hall library when their own space became insufficient for the sizable Nike. The original statue is on display in the Louvre in Paris.

Eight limited-edition etchings by Vermont artist Brian D. Cohen can be found in the 3rd floor reference area of the library. These etchings were done to illustrate the book Reading the Forested Landscape: A Natural history of New England by Tom Wessels. The Art in State Buildings committee is responsible for the etchings’ location in the library, and also for several other works by Vermont artists. Guy Wachtel, an artist from South Newfane, Vermont, did a painting titled “Girl Reading” which was commissioned in 1997 by this committee. Mimi Love, a painter from Middlebury, also has two paintings on display, both of which are representations of local scenes.

== Namesake ==
Samuel Read Hall was born in Croydon, New Hampshire on October 27, 1795, and moved shortly thereafter to Guildhall, Vermont. He was educated at home and never attended college. Like his father before him, Hall studied for the ministry instead and was licensed to preach in 1823. He received an appointment to serve in Concord, Vermont, a frontier town of 800. He accepted the position in Concord with the stipulation that he be allowed to open a school for teachers, and on March 11, 1823, he formally established the Columbia School, the first teacher training school in the United States. By November, the school had outgrown its quarters and moved to a new building where the named was changed to the Concord Academy.

In 1829, Hall wrote the first instructional book on teaching, called “Lectures on School Keeping.” This book was so influential and popular that it went through ten printings, and was reissued in 1929 with a new biography of Hall and a bibliography of his works. He continued to teach teachers, and wrote several other textbooks for both teachers and students. He left Concord in 1830 and moved to Andover, Massachusetts, to become principal of Phillips Andover Academy's new teacher training program. In 1837, he moved to Plymouth, New Hampshire to serve at Holmes-Plymouth Academy and then later, in 1840, he finally moved back to the area of Vermont known as the Northeast Kingdom. He was influential in creating the teacher's training department at Craftsbury Academy, in Craftsbury Common, Vermont.

Hall's contributions to educational innovation were recognized in 1839 when he received an honorary Master of Arts degree from Dartmouth College and in 1865 when he received an honorary degree of LL.D., Doctorate of Law from the University of Vermont.
