= Justice Hinman =

Justice Hinman may refer to:

- George E. Hinman (1870–1961), associate justice of the Connecticut Supreme Court of Errors
- Joel Hinman (1802–1870), associate justice and chief justice of the Connecticut Supreme Court
