= Old Stone House Museum =

Historic house museum in Vermont, US

- U.S. Historic district – Contributing property
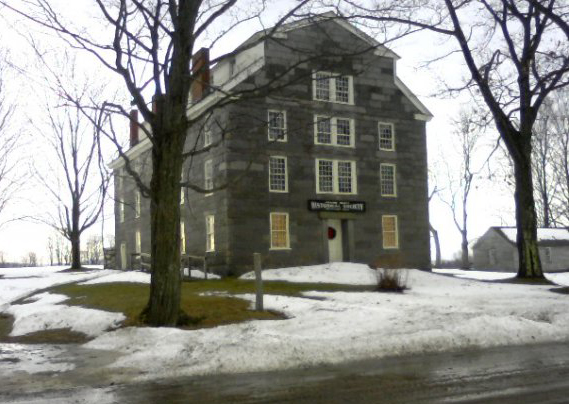
- Athenian Hall in Brownington, Vermont
- Location: 109 Old Stone House Rd., Brownington, VT
- Nearest city: Newport
- Coordinates: 44.8357°N 72.1663°W
- Website: http://oldstonehousemuseum.org
- Part of: Brownington Village Historic District (ID73000197)
- Designated CP: May 9, 1973

The Old Stone House Museum & Historic Village is a museum run by the Orleans County Historical Society in Brownington, Vermont. The Old Stone House at the heart of the village is a part of the Brownington Village Historic District, a district of ten historic buildings added to the National Register of Historic Places in 1973.

== History ==
The Old Stone House, or Athenian Hall, was built in 1836 by Alexander Twilight, the nation's first African-American college graduate. Twilight was the minister of the Brownington Congregational Church and the principal of the Orleans County Grammar School.

The Orleans County Grammar School was the only high school in the county, which required many students to travel long distances for their education. They boarded with families in town, including Twilight's. Athenian Hall was built to accommodate the larger number of students attending the Grammar School.

Twilight pressed his board of trustees for a larger building but failed to receive support from the majority. He alienated many of the trustees by his adamancy, and the building was left completely to Twilight. In 1834, he laid out a foundation plan for land donated by Cyrus Eaton across the road from his house. It called for a four-story granite building measuring 26 by 66 feet (7.9 by 20.1 m). Over the following two years the present stone house was erected following the lines and general appearance of a similar building, quite possibly Painter Hall at Middlebury College; however, detailed information is not available on how the granite structure was built.

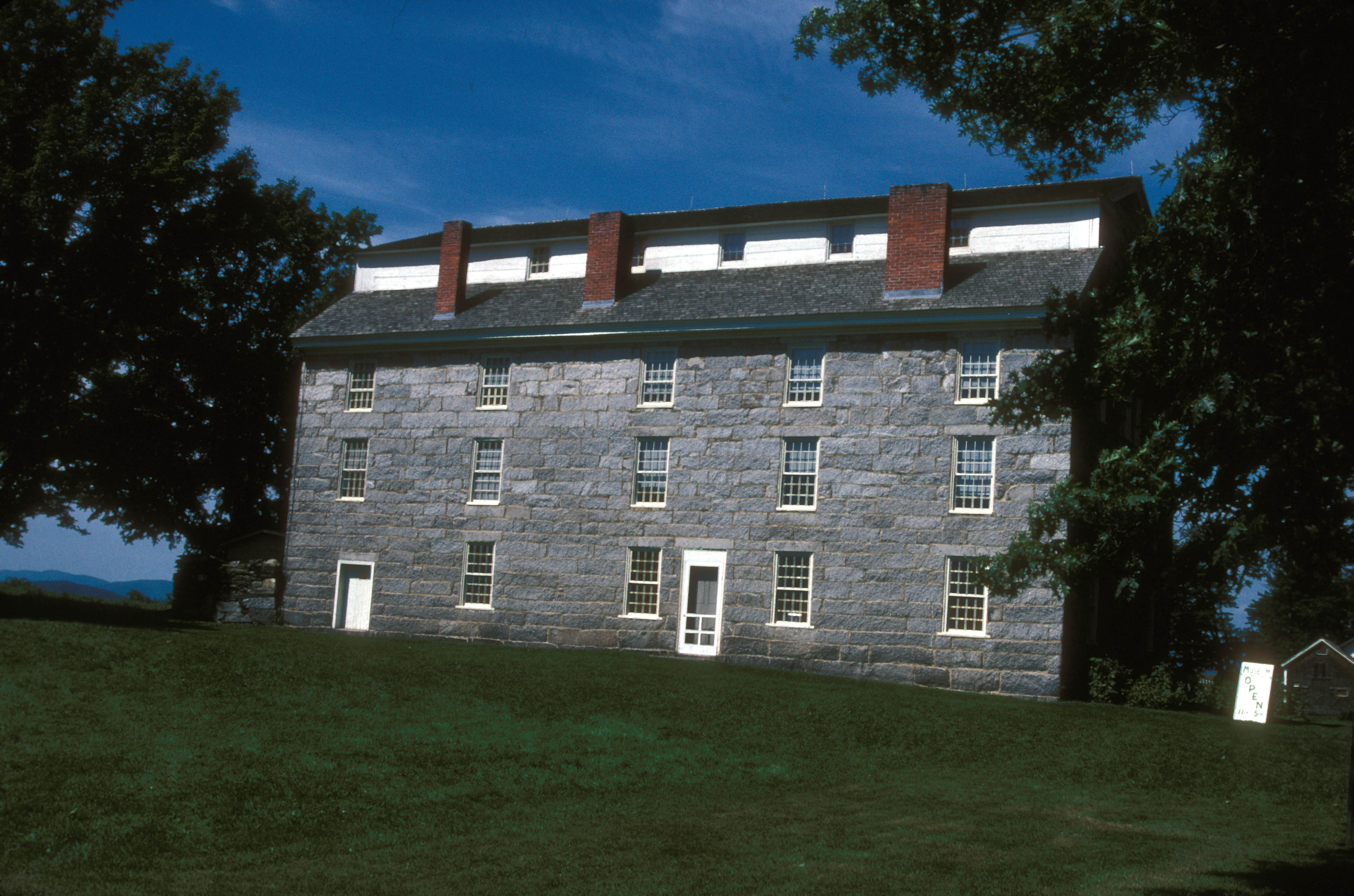
View from the side

Twilight began building in 1834 and finished two years later. From 1836 to 1859, the building was used as a dormitory for school children, boys and girls. Due to diminishing school enrollment Athenian Hall was closed for good in 1859. For a brief time Mercy Ladd Merrill Twilight continued to live there with a few boarders. She then continued alone until she moved to Derby in 1865. When she died in 1878 she was buried next to her husband in Brownington.

The building stayed vacant until in 1918 when the Stone House was put up for auction. A representative of the railroad in the state of Vermont bid on the structure with the hopes of using the granite stones for bridge abutments. The Orleans County Historical Society bid at the price of $500 (the equivalent of $10702 in current dollars) and won the auction. The building was opened as a museum in 1925. The attached barn was torn down in the 1920s.

The building has four floors with twenty-two rooms of exhibits. It is dedicated to the history of the last two centuries in Orleans County, Vermont, and to the life of Alexander Twilight, the first African-American college graduate in the U.S. and state legislator.
