= Aldace F. Walker =

American businessman (1842–1901)

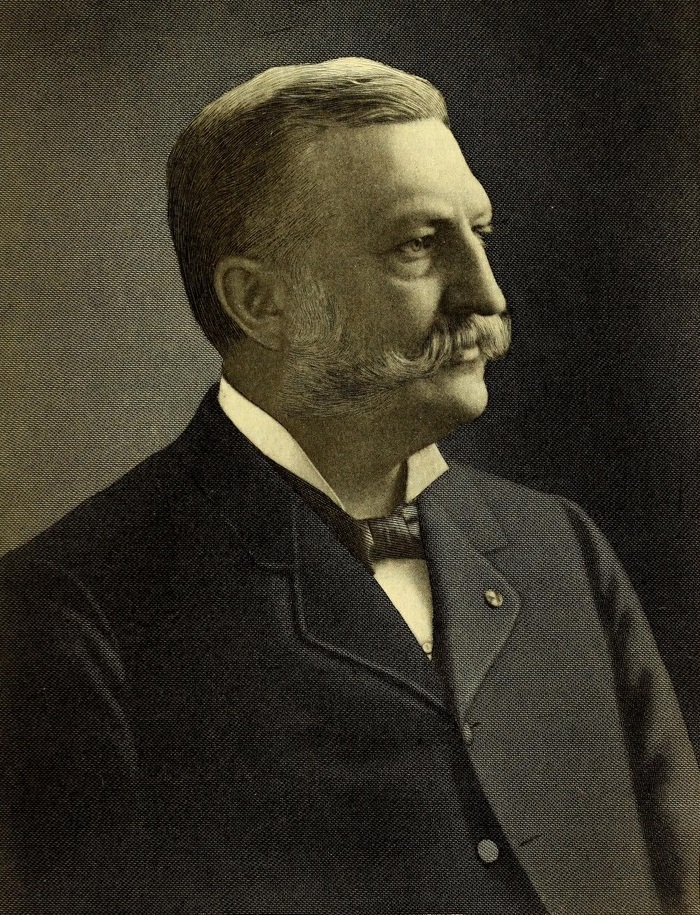
From Volume 5 of 1923's Vermont, the Green Mountain State

Aldace Freeman Walker (May 11, 1842 – April 12, 1901) was an American businessman. He was one of the original members of the Interstate Commerce Commission (ICC) when the organization was founded in 1887. Walker soon became the thirteenth president of the Atchison, Topeka and Santa Fe Railway (Santa Fe).

== Youth and military service ==
Aldace Walker was born on May 11, 1842, in West Rutland, Vermont, the son of Aldace Walker, D. D. and Mary A. Baker. He attended Kimball Union Academy in Meriden, New Hampshire, and then Middlebury College where he graduated in 1862.

His professional career started with military service as he enlisted with the 11th Vermont Infantry for service in the American Civil War. Walker was promoted through the ranks to become a lieutenant colonel before he was mustered out in June 1865. In 1869 he published a book of his experience in the war titled The Vermont Brigade in the Shenandoah Valley.

== Transportation leadership ==
After the war, Walker studied law and began his practice in New York City in 1867. There he joined Strong & Shepard, owned by Theron R. Strong and Elliott Fitch Shepard. At first he was the firm's managing clerk, and became a partner and lawyer there in 1870. For the next seven years, he worked on many cases involving rail transport, including the land appropriation for the Spuyten Duyvil and Port Morris Railway which would connect the Hudson River Railroad and the New York and Harlem Railroad.

When the senior partner in Walker's firm died, the practice was broken up and Walker moved to Rutland, Vermont, where he joined the practice of Prout, Simons & Walker. In this position too, Walker worked on cases that involved local railroads including the Rutland Railroad, Delaware and Hudson Canal Company, Vermont and Canada Railroad, Vermont Central Railroad and others until he left the firm to become a member of the Interstate Commerce Commission (ICC) in Washington, D.C.

In 1889 he resigned his position at the ICC to become the chairman of the Interstate Commerce Railway Association, and later the same role for the Western Traffic Association. Walker assumed the Santa Fe's presidency when Joseph Reinhart resigned on August 8, 1894.

When the Atlantic and Pacific Railroad (A&P) filed for bankruptcy, Walker and John J. McCook, another executive with the Santa Fe, were appointed as the A&P's receivers in December 1895. At this time, Walker stepped down from the Santa Fe's presidency, but remained on the Board of Directors as Chairman.

Preceded by Joseph Reinhart	President of the Atchison, Topeka and Santa Fe Railway; 1894–1895	Succeeded by Edward Payson Ripley
