= Allen Manvel =

American businessman

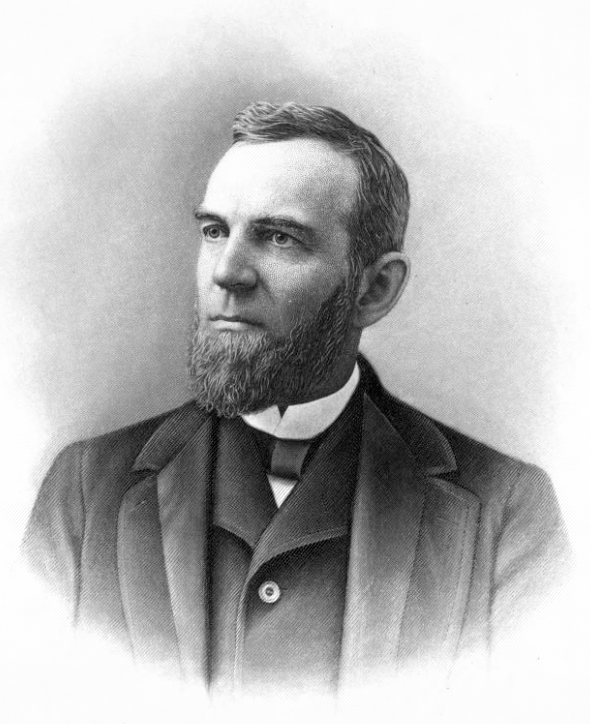
- Born: September 26, 1837; Alexander, New York, U.S.
- Died: February 24, 1893 (aged 55); Coronado, California, U.S.
- Burial place: Mount Hope Cemetery
- Occupation: Railroad executive

Allen Manvel (September 26, 1837 – February 24, 1893) was the eleventh president of the Atchison, Topeka and Santa Fe Railway.

== Biography ==
Manvel was born in Alexander, New York. In 1859, he began employment with the Chicago, Rock Island and Pacific Railroad as a clerk in the purchasing agent's office. He worked his way up through the ranks to become the general superintendent. His employment shifted to the St. Paul, Minneapolis and Manitoba Railway (SPM&M) in 1881, where he started as assistant general manager. He was promoted through a series of management positions there to become the general manager himself.

In 1889 he left the SPM&M to succeed William Barstow Strong as president of the Atchison, Topeka and Santa Fe Railway, a position he held until 1893. Manvel was succeeded by Joseph Reinhart.

He died at the Hotel del Coronado near San Diego on February 24, 1893. He was buried at Mount Hope Cemetery.

== Legacy ==
Like other Santa Fe presidents, Manvel's name was adopted as the name for a town in the American West. The town of Manvel, Texas, was named in his honor.

Preceded by William Barstow Strong	President of the Atchison, Topeka and Santa Fe Railway; 1889 – 1893	Succeeded by Joseph Reinhart
