= Timothy Hinman =

American road builder

Timothy Hinman (21 July 1762 - 29 April 1850) in Woodbury, Connecticut was a pioneer settler and road builder who constructed the Hinman Settler Road in Orleans County, Vermont. He was married to Phebe Stoddard (5 November 1769 - 15 July 1858). A historical marker placed by the town of Derby, Vermont near Hinman's homestead on U.S. Route 5 names "the honorable Timothy Hinman" as town founder, and notes that he served in the American Revolutionary War, first came to Derby in 1790, constructed the first house in the town in 1794, and would go on to serve as Chief Judge of Orleans County, legislator, importer/exporter, banker and church founder. He also operated a dry goods store and tavern in Derby.

The often-romanticized "Sketch of the Life of Hon. Timothy Hinman" by Bingham cited in the References below, short on specific details to back up its sometimes florid prose, contrasts with the detailed and carefully documented account by Sangree also cited below, "The Checkered Career of Timothy Hinman." Sangree quotes from Hinman's gravestone inscription to establish her point: "'Faithful, honest, just, and good' is strong praise for a man who, in addition to building roads, starting a town from scratch, and rendering judicial decisions, speculated in land, selling the lots at huge profits; smuggled and traded with the enemy; cheated his associates; defaulted on thousands of dollars of loans and betrayed the public trust; and upon conviction, escaped from jail. Hinman’s life illustrates the contradictions inherent in financial risk taking early in the nineteenth century: While the potential for accumulating wealth was great, the chances of ruin were also high".
