= Brownington, Vermont =

- Town
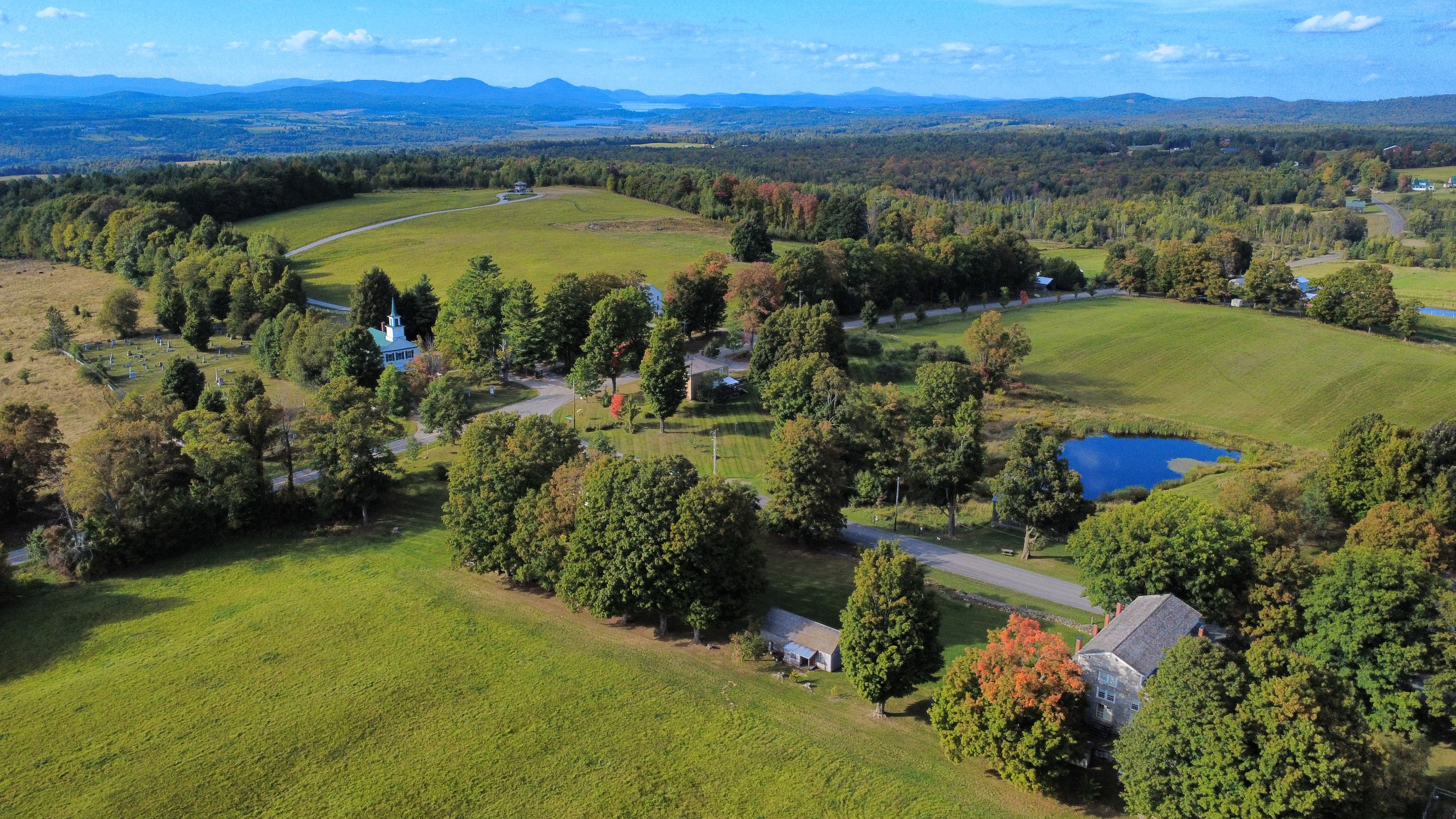
- Brownington Village from the southeast

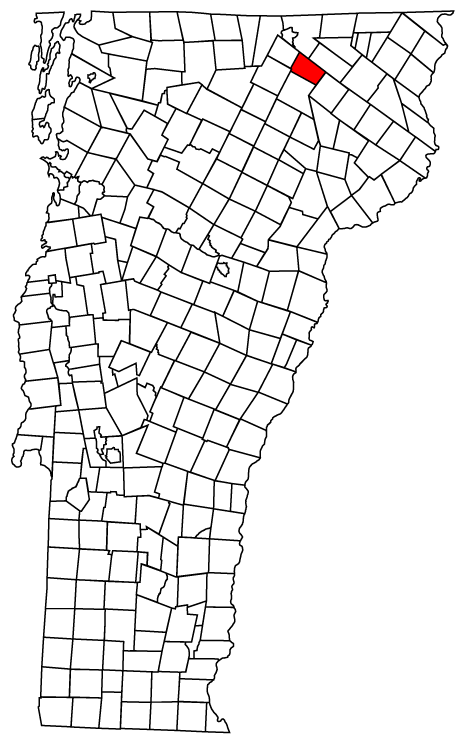
- Located in Orleans County, Vermont
- Coordinates: 44°50′52″N 72°08′30″W
- Country: United States
- State: Vermont
- County: Orleans
- Chartered: October 2, 1790
- Settled: 1796
- Organized: 1799
- Communities: Brownington Center; Brownington Village; Evansville

Area
  - Total: 28.4 sq mi (73.6 km^{2})
  - Land: 28.3 sq mi (73.3 km^{2})
  - Water: 0.15 sq mi (0.4 km^{2})
- Elevation: 1,135 ft (346 m)

Population (2020)
  - Total: 1,042
  - Density: 37/sq mi (14.2/km^{2})
- Time zone: UTC-5 (EST)
  - Summer (DST): UTC-4 (EDT)
- ZIP Codes: 05860 (Brownington); 05855 (Newport)
- Area code: 802
- FIPS code: 50-09850
- GNIS feature ID: 1462056
- Website: www.browningtonvt.com

Brownington is a town in Orleans County, Vermont, United States. The population was 1,042 as of the 2020 census.

== Geography ==
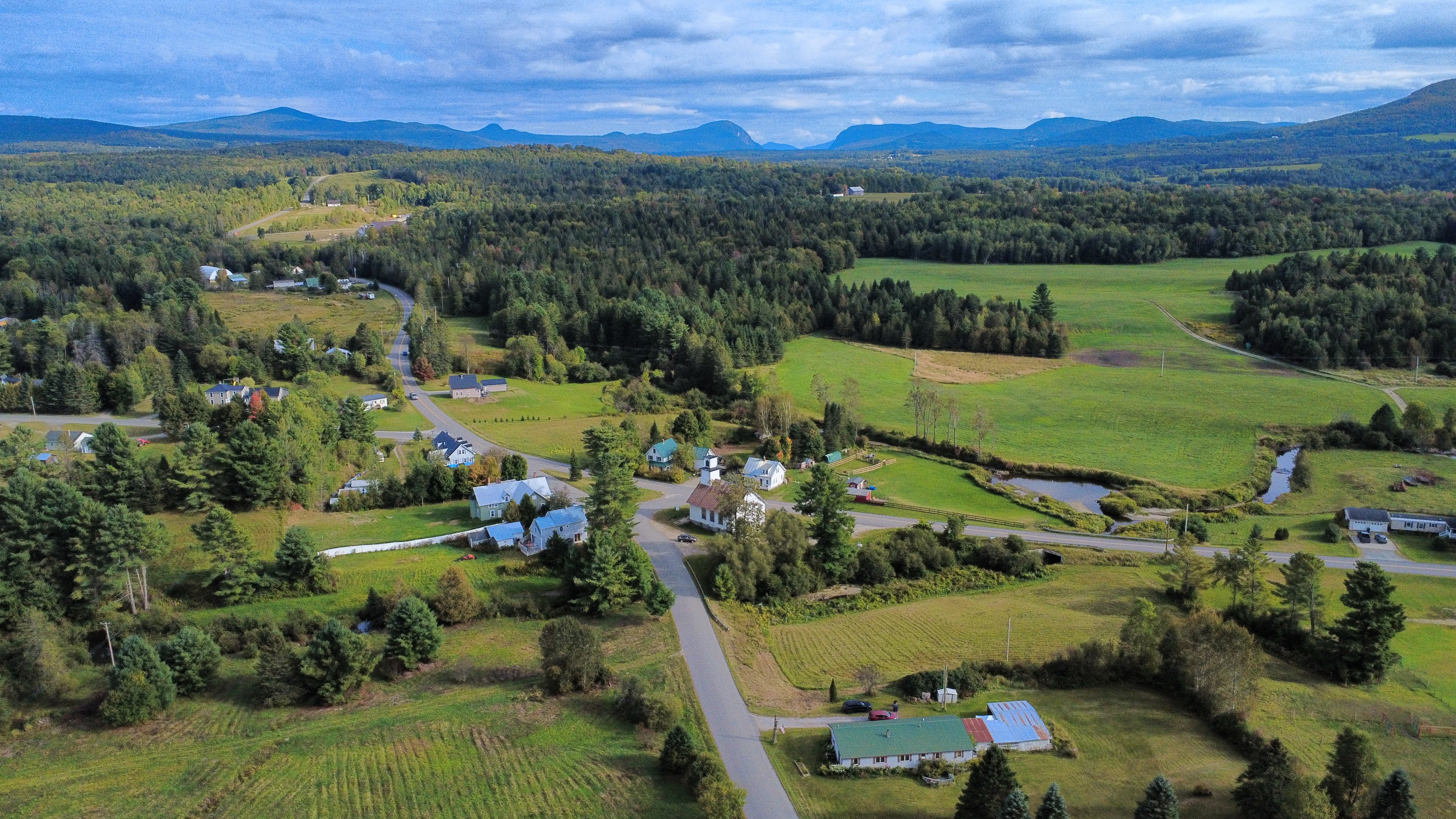
Brownington Center from the northwest

According to the United States Census Bureau, the town has a total area of 28.4 square miles (73.6 km^{2}), of which 28.3 square miles (73.2 km^{2}) is land and 0.1 square mile (0.4 km^{2}) (0.49%) is water.

Brownington has three unincorporated villages: Brownington, Brownington Center, and Evansville.

The lie of the town is moderate but uneven. The central part of town is somewhat elevated. The Willoughby River flows through the southern part of town. Small streams are found throughout. Brownington Pond is in the north, partly in Derby.

The northeast part of town is delimited from its neighbor, the town of Charleston, by Chilafoux Road, which runs northwest–southeast, for about one-third of its length.

=== Geology ===
Rocks are mostly of the calciferous mica schist, except in the southeastern part, where they are granite. A narrow vein of hornblende schist extends through the central part, from north to south.

== History ==
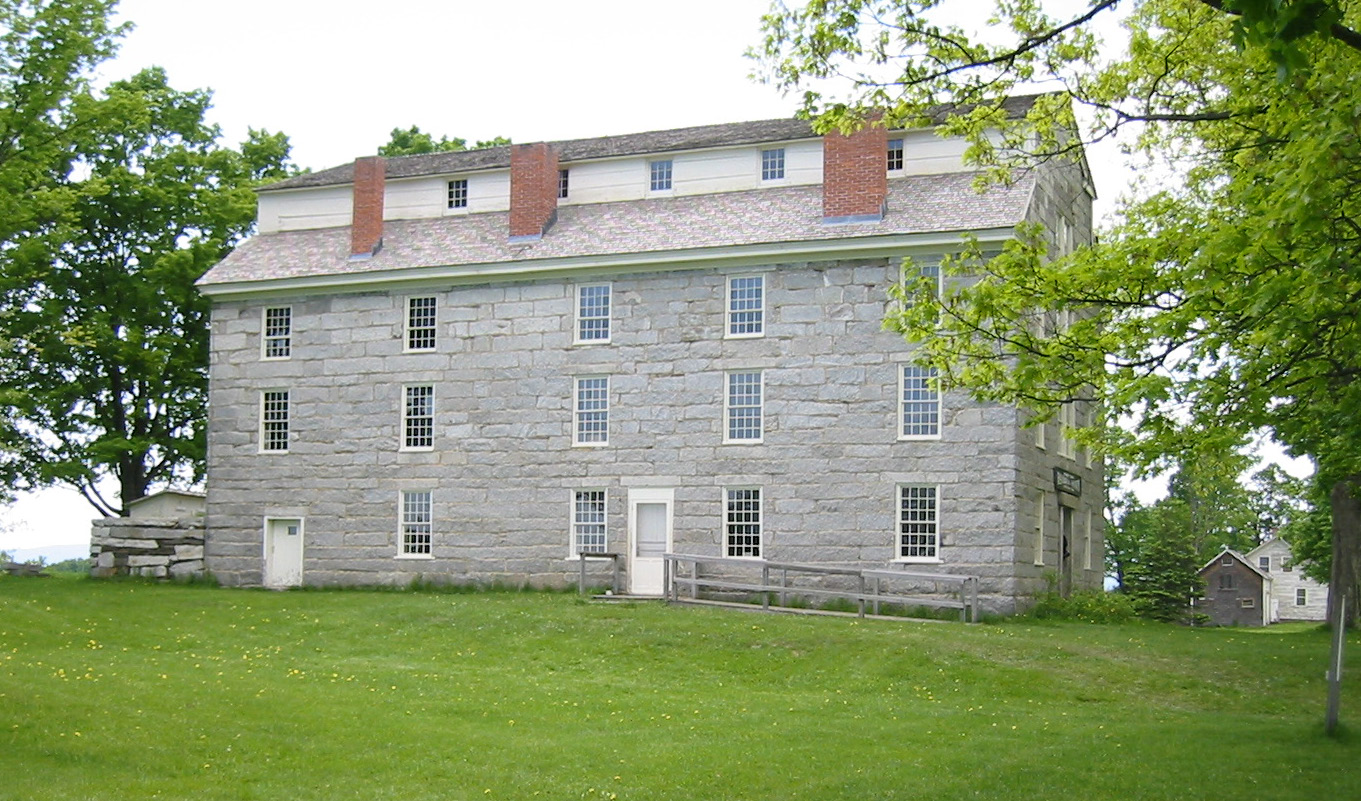
The Old Stone House Museum

The town was named after the family Brown. Two chief grantees of Brownington were Daniel and Timothy Brown. There were six other male Browns and one woman, Sarah.

Until 1816, court convened here, alternating with Craftsbury, both shire towns of the county. After that year, the legislature changed the county seat to Irasburg.

Alexander Twilight built Athenian Hall, now called the Old Stone House as a dormitory for a boarding academy in 1836. It is a museum today.

Part of the museum complex is the Samuel Read Hall House, located on the Hinman Settler Road. This Federal-style building was completed in 1831. For about twenty years it was the home of Hall, a pioneer in the field of American education.

The Orleans County Grammar School was moved back to its original location on August 8, 2016, by a team of 46 oxen. The school was built in 1823.

== Local government ==
=== Town ===
- Selectboard – Bev White, Michael Glodgett, Bill Falconer
- Town Clerk – Cheryl Galipeau
- Tax Collector – Valerie Faust
- Auditors – Barbara Thompson, Kim Hastings, Brandy Robillard
- Member, Planning Board – Roger Samuel
- Second Constable – Renee Falconer
- General Fund Budget – $227,683
- Highway Budget – $571,270

In 2008, the town received its fire department services from the adjacent village of Orleans in the town of Barton.

=== School District ===
The local school is part of the OSCU (Orleans Central Supervisory Union). The local school educates students K–8. Brownington pays the OCSU to educate grades 9–12 out of its budget at Lake Region Union High School (#24).

- School Director – Larry Chase
- Principal – Elaine Collins
- Student:Teacher ratio – 12:1 (State average 10:1)
- Budget – $1,915,545

== Demographics ==
Historical population
Census	Pop.	Note	%±
1800	65		—
1810	236		263.1%
1820	265		12.3%
1830	412		55.5%
1840	486		18.0%
1850	613		26.1%
1860	761		24.1%
1870	901		18.4%
1880	854		−5.2%
1890	799		−6.4%
1900	748		−6.4%
1910	760		1.6%
1920	741		−2.5%
1930	697		−5.9%
1940	689		−1.1%
1950	673		−2.3%
1960	599		−11.0%
1970	522		−12.9%
1980	708		35.6%
1990	705		−0.4%
2000	885		25.5%
2010	988		11.6%
2020	1,042		5.5%
U.S. Decennial Census

As of the census of 2000, there were 885 people, 337 households, and 239 families residing in the town. The population density was 31.3 people per square mile (12.1/km^{2}). There were 450 housing units at an average density of 15.9 per square mile (6.1/km^{2}). The racial makeup of the town was 97.06% White, 0.45% African American, 1.24% Native American, 0.23% Asian, 0.34% from other races, and 0.68% from two or more races. Hispanic or Latino of any race were 0.45% of the population.

There were 337 households, out of which 35.0% had children under the age of 18 living with them, 57.3% were married couples living together, 10.4% had a female householder with no husband present, and 28.8% were non-families. 21.4% of all households were made up of individuals, and 8.0% had someone living alone who was 65 years of age or older. The average household size was 2.63 and the average family size was 3.02.

In the town, the population was spread out, with 27.2% under the age of 18, 7.5% from 18 to 24, 28.8% from 25 to 44, 26.4% from 45 to 64, and 10.1% who were 65 years of age or older. The median age was 38 years. For every 100 females, there were 103.4 males. For every 100 females age 18 and over, there were 104.4 males.

The median income for a household in the town was $29,667, and the median income for a family was $37,721. Males had a median income of $26,210 versus $21,250 for females. The per capita income for the town was $14,004. About 10.8% of families and 17.9% of the population were below the poverty line, including 24.8% of those under age 18 and 25.3% of those age 65 or over.

== Cultural events ==
- "Old Stonehouse Day" in August when the Brownington Village Historic District is open to the public free of charge
- Abenaki Clan of the Hawk:
  - Annual Native American Crafts Fair since 1998.
  - Annual International Pow Wow. Has been held since 1991.
- One of forty 'places to visit' on Vermont's Northeast Kingdom Geotourism MapGuide

== Notable people ==
- Portus Baxter, US congressman
- Stephen Perry Jocelyn, US Army brigadier general, born in Brownington
- James Woodward Strong college president; brother of William Strong
- William Barstow Strong, president of the Atchison, Topeka and Santa Fe Railway; brother of James Strong
- Dave Templeman, Vermont state legislator
- Alexander Twilight, first African American to serve in a state legislature and to receive a degree from an American University
