= Arthur Hinman =

Australian rules footballer (1890–1915)

Personal information
- Full name: Arthur Gurr Hinman
- Born: 19 June 1890; Launceston, Tasmania
- Died: 10 May 1915 (aged 24); Gallipoli, Ottoman Turkey
- Original team: Launceston
- Position: Wing

Playing career^{1}
Years	Club	Games (Goals)
1910–1911	University	25 (0)
- ^{1} Playing statistics correct to the end of 1911.

Arthur Gurr Hinman (19 June 1890 – 10 May 1915) was an Australian rules footballer who played for the University Football Club in the Victorian Football League (VFL).

== Family ==
The third of four children of Arthur Hinman (c.1858-1914), and Lucy Maud Hinman (?–1918), née Gurr, Arthur Gurr Hinman Hinman was born in Launceston, on 19 June 1890.

He was the elder brother of VFL footballer Bill Hinman.

== Education ==
He was educated at Launceston Church Grammar School.

While in his final year at school, he played for the Launceston Football Club, before studying science at the University of Tasmania.

He subsequently studied mining engineering at the University of Melbourne.

== Football ==
During 1910 and 1911 he was a regular player for the University Football Club in the VFL competition. Notable events in his career include a burst artery in his arm and missing a match in 1911 because he was on an expedition.

Having completed his final exams in 1913, graduating B.M.Eng. in absentia, in April 1914, Hinman returned to Tasmania to work for the Mount Bischoff Tin Mine.

== Military service ==
Hinman enlisted soon after World War I broke out and joined the 15th Battalion, which departed Australia in late December 1914. After a period of training in Egypt, during which he was promoted to Lieutenant, Hinman first saw action at Gallipoli on 25 April 1915.

== Death ==
He died when retreating after an unsuccessful attempt by the 15th Battalion to take Quinn's Post on 10 May 1915.

== See also ==
- List of Victorian Football League players who died on active service
