= Joel Hinman =

American judge

Joel Hinman (January 27, 1802 – February 21, 1870) was born to Colonel Joel Hinman in Southbury, New Haven County, Connecticut, United States. He was the grandson of Benjamin Hinman.

== Connecticut Supreme Court ==
After serving as a Connecticut State Senator from 1835 to 1836, Hinman went on to serve on the Connecticut Supreme Court starting in 1842. He later became the Chief Justice in 1861 and held this position until his death in 1870.
