= William Barstow Strong =

American businessman (1837–1914)

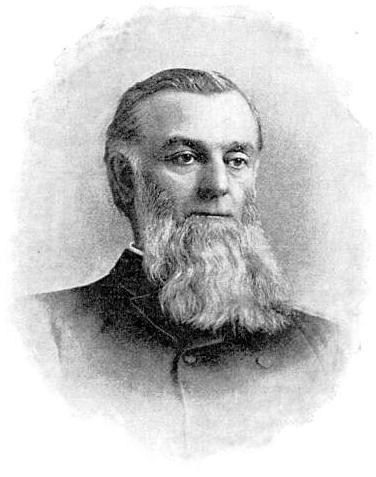
- Born: May 16, 1837; Brownington, Vermont, U.S.
- Died: August 3, 1914 (aged 77); Los Angeles, California, U.S.
- Spouse: Abbie J. Moore

William Barstow Strong (May 16, 1837 – August 3, 1914) served as president of the Atchison, Topeka and Santa Fe Railway from 1881 to 1889. He is often referred to as either William B. Strong or W. B. Strong.

== Life and career ==
He was born in Brownington, Vermont on May 16, 1837. Strong graduated from Bell's Business College in Chicago, Illinois, in 1855, and soon launched his career in railroading. His first railroad job was as a station agent for the Milwaukee and St. Paul Railroad, a position that was introduced to him by his older brother James.

He married Abbie J. Moore, October 2, 1859, in Beloit, Wisconsin. They had three children, a girl and two boys.

He worked his way through several railroad jobs successively for the Chicago, Milwaukee and St. Paul Railway, McGregor Western Railway, Chicago and North Western Railway, Chicago, Burlington and Quincy Railroad (CB&Q), and as superintendent of the Michigan Central Railroad in the 1870s. In this position, Strong was succeeded by Henry Brockholst Ledyard Jr. in 1876. He returned to the CB&Q after working on the Michigan Central and then joined the management team of the Santa Fe as General Manager, and was promoted to Vice President within a month.

On July 12, 1881, he succeeded T. Jefferson Coolidge as president of the Atchison, Topeka and Santa Fe Railway (ATSF). Under his tenure, the ATSF expanded to about 7,000 miles (11,265 km) of right-of-way, which at the time made the ATSF the largest railroad in North America. He held the presidency until his retirement in 1889.

The city of Barstow, California, where the ATSF maintained extensive shop and equipment construction and repair facilities, the town of Strong City, Kansas, and Stronghurst, Illinois are named in his honor.

William B. Strong's work with the Atchison, Topeka and Santa Fe Railway is extensively chronicled in the book From the River to the Sea by John Sedgwick.

== Other uses of the name William Barstow Strong ==
William Barstow Strong was the name of an observation car owned by the ATSF and operated in business trains in the latter part of the 20th century.

William B. Strong was included in a list of names that traveled aboard NASA's Stardust spacecraft which visited the comet Wild 2 in 2004.

An observation car on the Royal Gorge Scenic Railway in Colorado is named William B. Strong.

== See also ==
- List of railroad executives

Preceded by	Superintendent of the Michigan Central Railroad –1876	Succeeded by Henry Brockholst Ledyard
Preceded by T. Jefferson Coolidge	President of the Atchison, Topeka and Santa Fe Railway; 1881–1889	Succeeded by Allen Manvel
