= William Carleton (Massachusetts businessman) =

American businessman (1797–1876)

William Carleton (1797–1876) was a prosperous manufacturer of brassware from Charlestown, Massachusetts.

In December 1870, Carleton was introduced to Reverend James W. Strong, the young president of Minnesota's fledgling Northfield College. Shortly thereafter, Strong was seriously, but not fatally, injured when his carriage was struck by a train. Upon learning of Strong's "almost miraculous" survival, Carleton was reportedly so moved that he gave $50,000 to the college, the largest single donation made to an American college outside the east at that time. The grateful trustees of the college renamed the school "Carleton College" in his honor, and each year the William Carleton Scholarship is given to select member(s) of the incoming freshman class in recognition of superior achievement and ability.
