= Oldest House Museum =

- U.S. National Register of Historic Places
- U.S. National Historic Landmark
- U.S. National Historic Landmark District – Contributing property
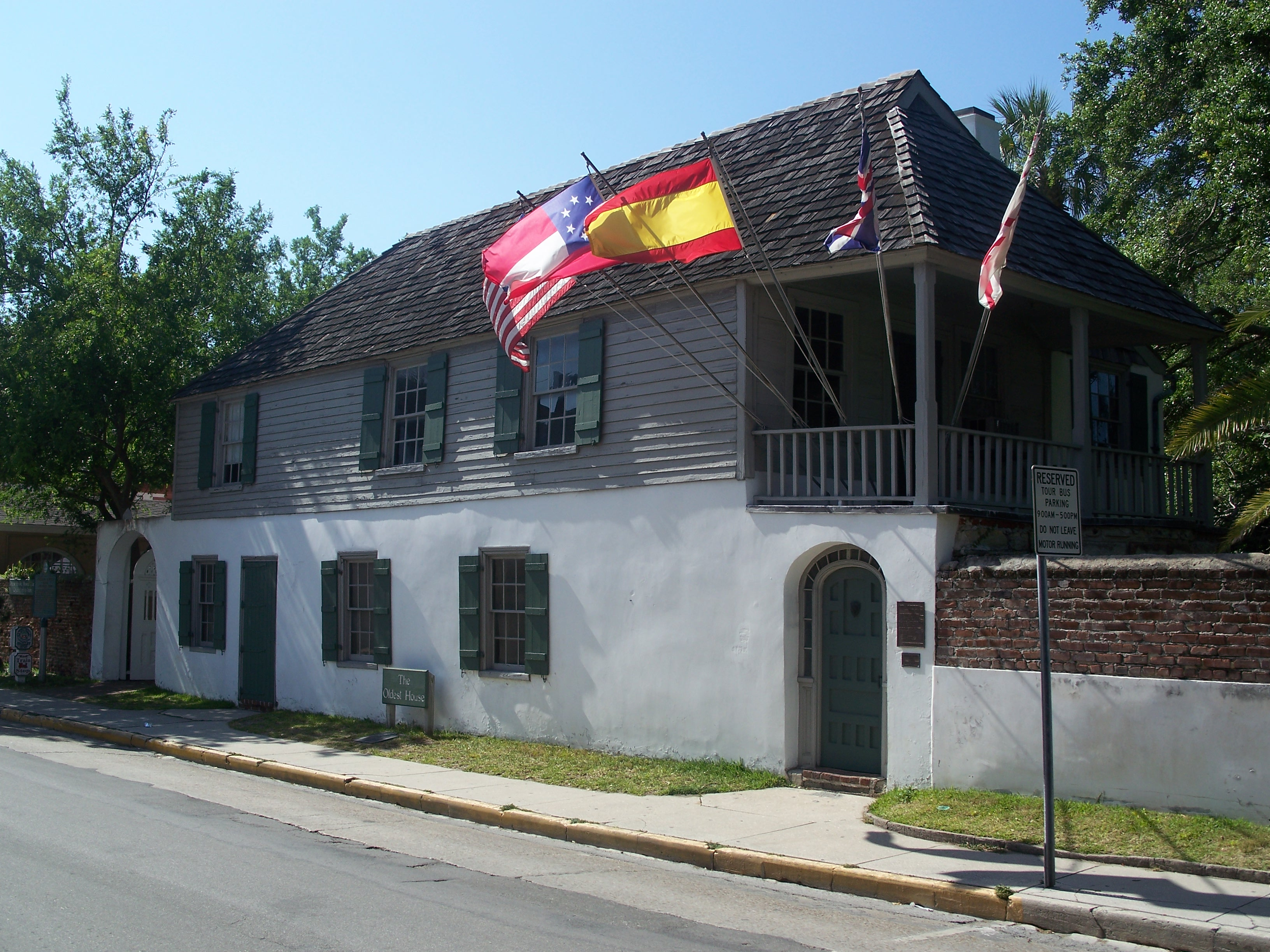

- Location within Florida Location within the United States
- Interactive map showing the location of Gonzalez-Alvarez House
- Location: 14 St. Francis St., St. Augustine, Florida
- Coordinates: 29°53′17″N 81°18′36″W
- Area: 2 acres (0.81 ha)
- Built: circa 1723, 1775–1786, 1790
- Architectural style: Stone Vernacular
- Part of: St. Augustine Town Plan Historic District (ID70000847)
- NRHP reference No.: 70000845

Significant dates
- Added to NRHP: April 15, 1970
- Designated NHL: April 15, 1970
- Designated NHLDCP: April 15, 1970

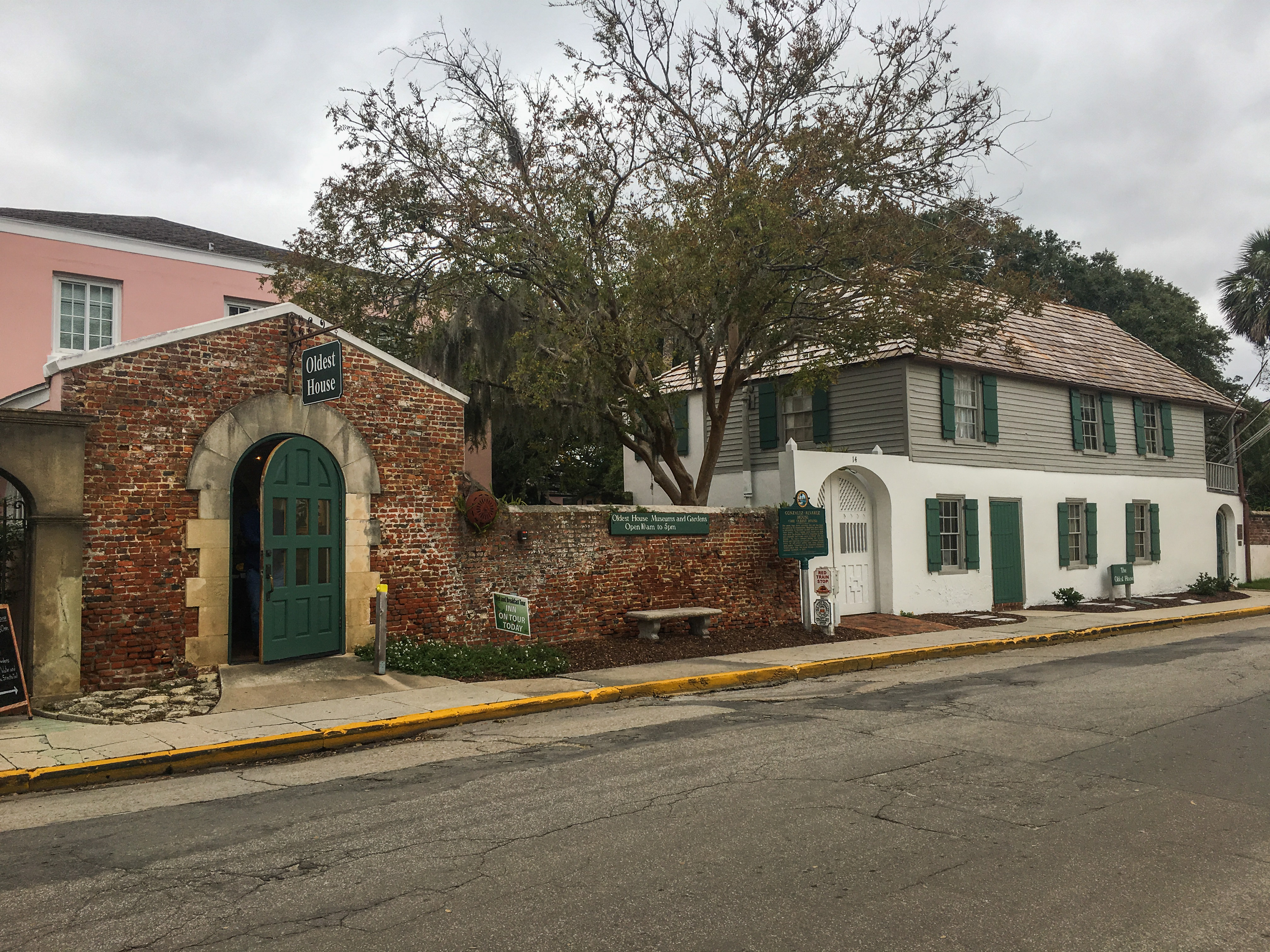
Oldest House Museum, December 2018

The Oldest House Museum is located in St. Augustine, Florida in St. Johns County, Florida. It is operated by the St. Augustine Historical Society and includes the González-Alvarez House, the Manucy Museum (named for Albert Manucy) of local history and the Edwards Gallery.

The Oldest House, from which the museum derives its name, is located on a site that has been occupied since the 1600s. Formally known as the González-Alvarez House, it is the oldest surviving Spanish Colonial dwelling in Florida. The building dates back to the early 1700s. The house has been open to visitors since 1893. The United States Department of the Interior designated the house a National Historic Landmark in 1970.
