= Bill Hinman =

Australian rules footballer

Personal information
- Full name: William Frederick Hinman
- Born: 1 July 1892; Launceston, Tasmania
- Died: 15 June 1964 (aged 71); Hobart
- Original team: North Launceston (NTFA)
- Position: Forward / Rover

Playing career^{1}
Years	Club	Games (Goals)
1911–14	University	35 (3)
- ^{1} Playing statistics correct to the end of 1914.

William Frederick Hinman MC (1 July 1892 – 15 June 1964) was an Australian rules footballer who played in Tasmania and with University in the Victorian Football League (VFL) during the 1910s.

Bill Hinman was born in Launceston, the youngest of four children born to Arthur Hinman and Lucy Maud Gurr and the younger brother of Arthur Hinman. He was educated at Launceston Church Grammar School. Hinman played with North Launceston in the Northern Tasmanian Football Association (NTFA) and was voted club champion for the 1910 season. He then moved to Victoria to pursue his law studies and played with University in the Victorian Football League (VFL).

After debuting for University in 1911, Hinman did not play in the 1912 VFL season, preferring to play tennis, before returning to University in 1913.

He had a distinguished military career in World War I, and was awarded the Military Cross in December 1916 for displaying "energy and initiative in reconnoitering enemy positions and obtaining information" during the Battle of Pozières. He was also awarded the Croix de Guerre and the Order of Leopold from Belgium.

In August 1918 he married Jean Agnes Gibson, a fellow Tasmanian who was working as a nurse, in London. They returned to Australia after the war and he became a lawyer in Hobart after the war was over, being admitted to the bar in 1920. He served as president of the Hobart Chamber of Commerce and remained an active sportsman, regularly competing in local golf tournaments. He died in 1964, survived by his wife and children.
