= Hinman Settler Road =

Highway in Vermont, USA

The Hinman Settler Road was constructed by former Revolutionary War veteran Timothy Hinman from 1791–1795 in Orleans County, Vermont. Hinman's intent was to help develop the land he owned in Derby.

The road is 30 miles (48 km) long. It starts at the Bayley Hazen Military Road in Greensboro. It proceeds north from there. When it reaches Glover, it is first called the Skunk Hollow Road, then Hinman Road, followed by Perron Hill Road and Young Road, and finally there is a long discontinued and unmaintained section through the old Parker Settlement and private property until it rejoins the town road system at Roaring Brook Road which runs on toward Barton Village. North of that village it follows the Maple Hill Road north, running through what is now the Orleans Country Club to Brownington. It continues north through Derby to the Canada–US border. It is nearly straight, bearing about 19 degrees from north.

Most of the road was used well into the nineteenth and often, the twentieth century. Some of the road is discontinued, some of it is dedicated trail under the supervision of the Forest and Parks Department, and some of it has reverted to town road status. (The road was originally under the aegis of the County Road Commissioners, but now is the responsibility of the respective Selectboards of the towns in which it is located.) In other places, it is unmaintained, for example in Barton, it leaves Maple Hill Road and becomes a "class 4" town highway until it gets to the golf course.

In Brownington and Derby it is a major north–south route, either class two or three town road and known by the historic name.
