= Craftsbury, Vermont =

- Town
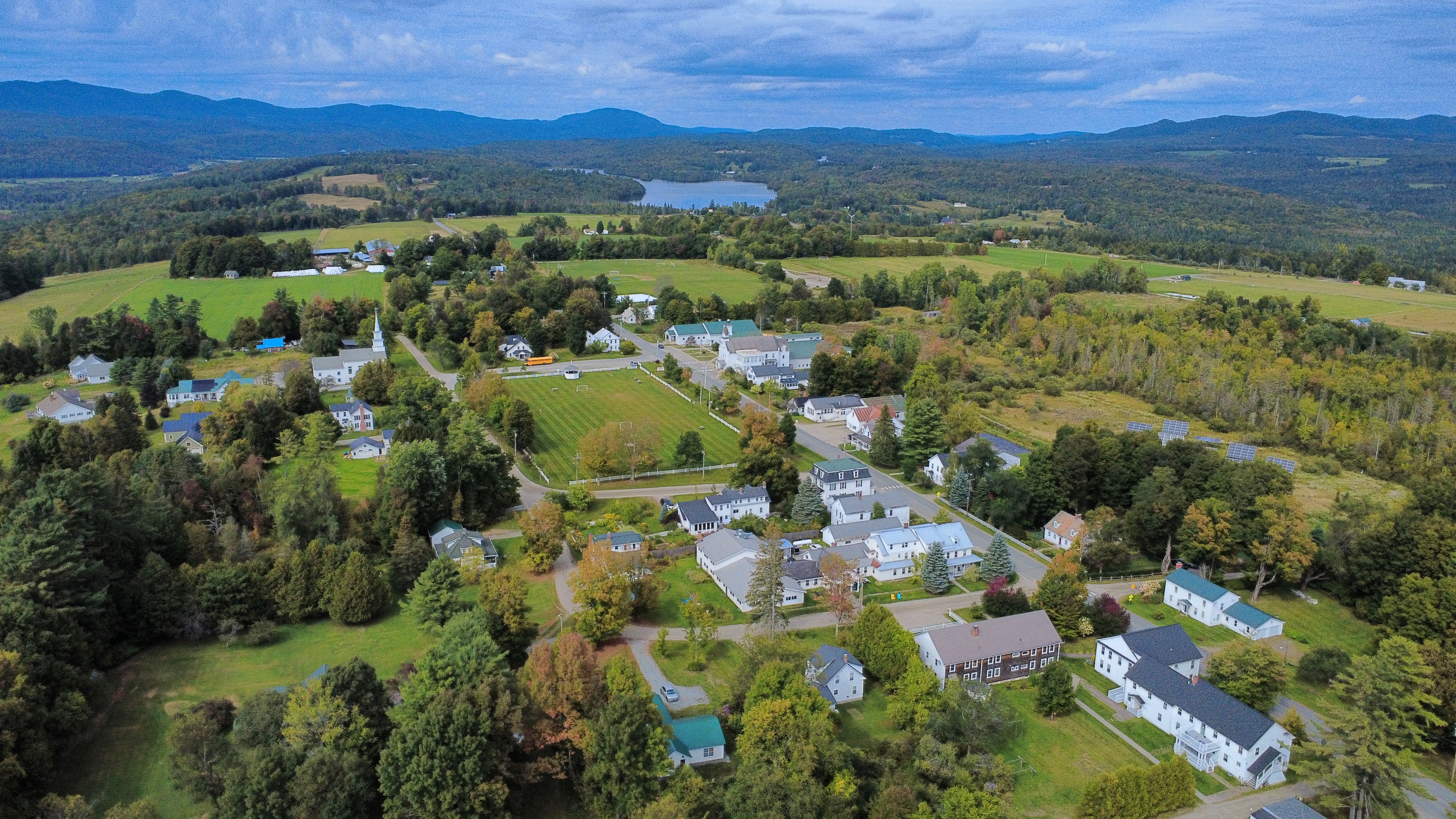
- The village of Craftsbury Common, from the south

- Seal

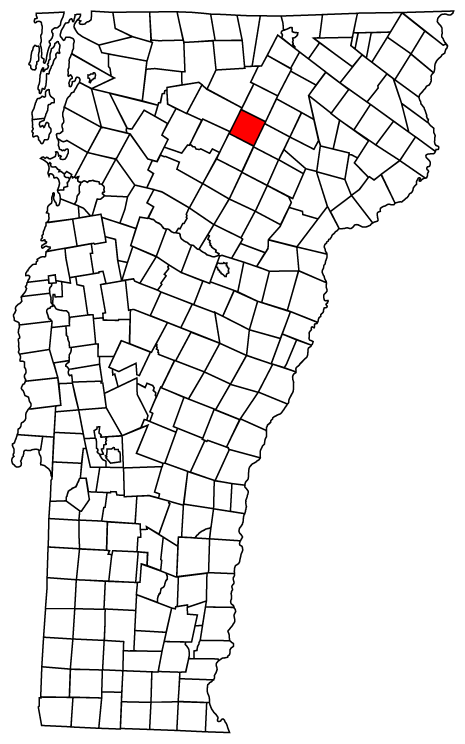
- Located in Orleans County, Vermont
- Coordinates: 44°37′56″N 72°22′45″W
- Country: United States
- State: Vermont
- County: Orleans
- Chartered: August 23, 1781
- Communities: Craftsbury; Craftsbury Common; East Craftsbury; Mill Village

Area
  - Total: 39.7 sq mi (102.9 km^{2})
  - Land: 39.3 sq mi (101.7 km^{2})
  - Water: 0.42 sq mi (1.1 km^{2})
- Elevation: 869 ft (265 m)

Population (2020)
  - Total: 1,343
  - Density: 34/sq mi (13.2/km^{2})
- Time zone: UTC-5 (EST)
  - Summer (DST): UTC-4 (EDT)
- ZIP Codes: 05826 (Craftsbury); 05827 (Craftsbury Common)
- Area code: 802
- FIPS code: 50-16300
- GNIS feature ID: 1462078
- Website: https://craftsbury.gov/

Craftsbury is a town in Orleans County, Vermont, United States. The population was 1,343 at the 2020 census. The town includes the unincorporated villages of Craftsbury, Craftsbury Common, Mill Village, and East Craftsbury.

== History ==
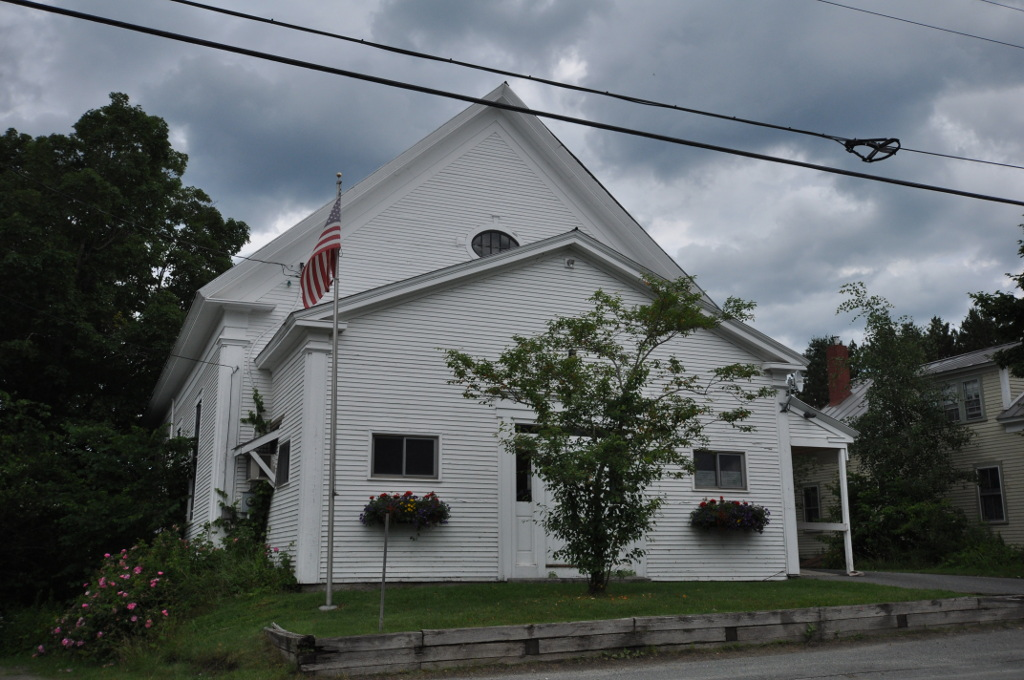
Craftsbury Town Hall

The state granted the town to Ebenezer Crafts, Timothy Newell, and sixty-two associates, on November 6, 1780. They named it Minden. It was changed to Craftsbury, in honor of Ebenezer Crafts, on October 27, 1790. Crafts was the first settler in the county.

North Craftsbury, later known as Craftsbury Common, was the first significant settlement in the town, and was for many years the center of culture and commerce, not only for Craftsbury, but for the greater region as well serving many of the neighboring towns. As mills multiplied around the town in the early 1800s additional settlements were made at Mill Village and in Craftsbury Village, while a predominantly Scottish settlement was made in East Craftsbury.

In 1840, the town needed 12 school districts to administer its schools, because of poor road infrastructure. There were 1,200 people, predominately engaged in farming. They owned 333 horses, 1,718 cattle, 3,166 sheep, and 658 pigs. They produced 47,906 pounds (21,730 kg) of potatoes, 14,398 US bushels (507,400 L; 115,180 US dry gal; 111,610 imp gal) oats, 5,705 US bushels (201,000 L; 45,640 US dry gal; 44,220 imp gal) of other crops, 3,171 short tons (2,877 t) of hay, and 35,412 pounds (16,063 kg) of maple sugar. The town had two gristmills, a hulling mill, two carding machine operations, ten sawmills, two fulling mills, three carriage makers, and one oil mill.

== Geography ==
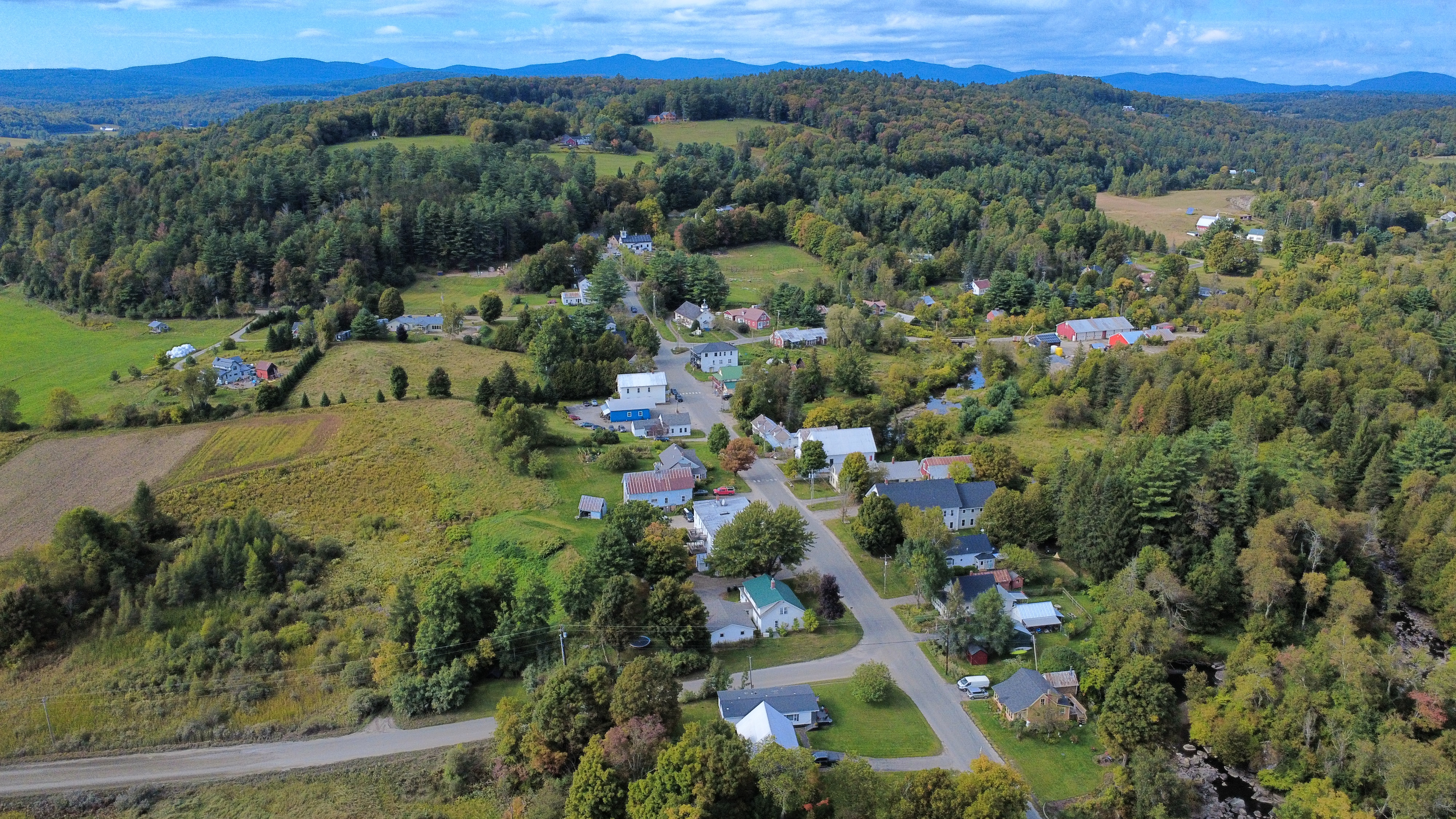
Craftsbury, VT, from the southeast

As tabulated by the United States Census Bureau, the town has a total area of 39.7 square miles (102.9 km^{2}), of which 39.3 square miles (101.7 km^{2}) is land and 0.4 square mile (1.1 km^{2}) (1.11%) is water.

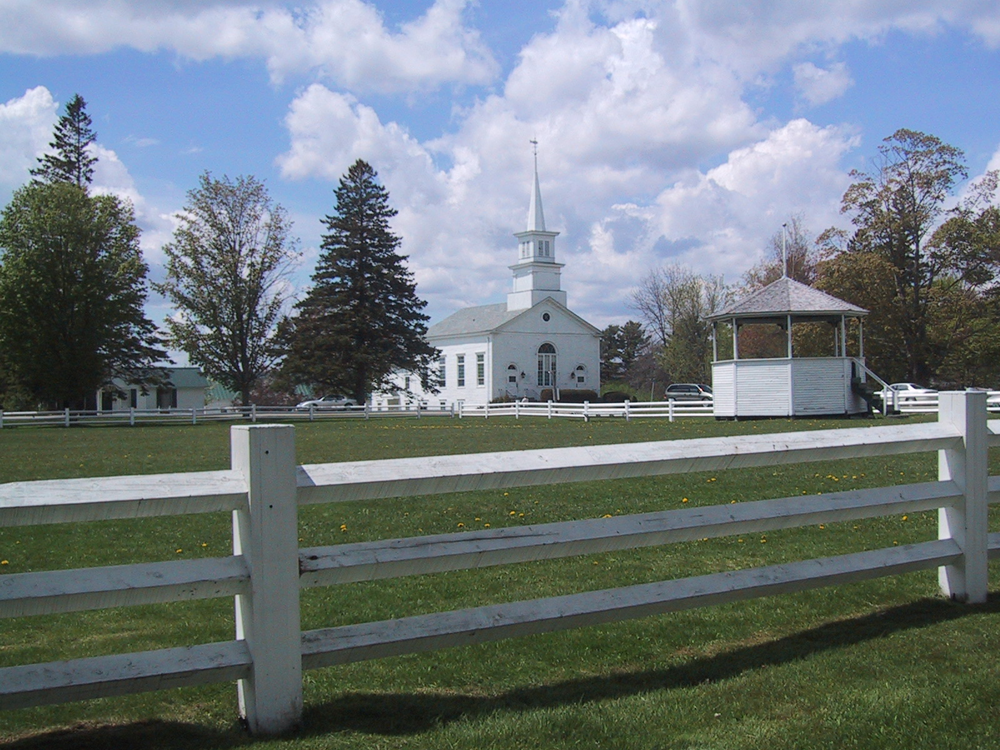
A view across Craftsbury Common showing the United Church of Craftsbury, and bandstand.

Craftsbury is on a plateau on the Catamount Trail.

There are many hills and valleys. The soil varies from alluvial meadows to clay and gravel. There are more numerous grades and varieties of soil than is usual.

There are five ponds or lakes.

Lake Elligo (also known as Eligo Pond) is partially in Greensboro. It is about two miles long and half a mile wide. Unusually, it has two outlets: one flows to the north and the other to the south. The northern outlet is one of the head branches of Black River. The southern flows through Little Elligo Pond and on to the Lamoille River in Hardwick. The eastern shore rises to cliffs. The western shore rises gradually. Near the center of the pond are two small islands. The lake was formerly a hunting-ground of the St. Francis Indians, who named it Elligo Scoloon.

The others are Great Hosmer Pond, lying partly in Albany, Little Hosmer Pond, and two other small ponds. The Black River is the main river in the town. It was called Elligo-sigo by the natives. Its current is slow. The drop from its source to Lake Memphremagog, including the falls at Irasburg and Coventry, is 190 feet. Wild branch, a tributary of the Lamoille, rises in Eden and flows through the western part of the town. The valley of the Black river in Craftsbury is a muck bed (some call it a wetland) averaging a quarter of a mile in width.

=== Geology ===
Geologically, the town varies in its structure to an unusual degree. There is granite in the east part of town. This alternates with gneiss and mica slate. In the central portions of town, the previous rocks are replaced by dark argillaceous slate. This alternates with siliceous limestone. These rocks are from the Devonian Period and are part of the Waits River Formation.

The rocks on the west side of the Black River also vary. These are older rocks from the Cambrian Period, Moretown Formation. State Route 14 runs along a seam where these east and west rock formation converge. Strata of mica slate, argillaceous, and chlorite slates, and limestones, alternate. An extensive deposit of gray granite is near Craftsbury village. It is broken on the surface. This rock is filled with nodules of black mica and quartz, in concentric layers. These are about one inch in diameter. In much of the area, the biotite orbicules are so numerous that a hundred may be counted within a circle two feet in diameter. In some parts of the ledge these nodules are flattened, as if subjected to an immense vertical pressure when the mass was in a semi-fluid state. In the nineteenth century these rocks were once believed to be unique from any other found in America or Europe. Today, it is known that they resemble those found in Bethel granite.

As the last glacial period ended, part of the town became submerged under the transient Lake Winooski which drained when its ice dam melted 14,000 years ago.

== Demographics ==
Historical population
Census	Pop.	Note	%±
1790	18		—
1800	229		1,172.2%
1810	566		147.2%
1820	605		6.9%
1830	982		62.3%
1840	1,151		17.2%
1850	1,223		6.3%
1860	1,413		15.5%
1870	1,330		−5.9%
1880	1,381		3.8%
1890	1,271		−8.0%
1900	1,251		−1.6%
1910	1,119		−10.6%
1920	1,042		−6.9%
1930	976		−6.3%
1940	875		−10.3%
1950	709		−19.0%
1960	674		−4.9%
1970	632		−6.2%
1980	844		33.5%
1990	994		17.8%
2000	1,136		14.3%
2010	1,206		6.2%
2020	1,343		11.4%
U.S. Decennial Census

As of the census of 2000, there were 1,136 people, 427 households, and 301 families residing in the town. The population density was 28.9 inhabitants per square mile (11.2/km^{2}). There were 572 housing units at an average density of 14.6 per square mile (5.6/km^{2}). The racial makeup of the town was 96.74% White, 0.35% African American, 0.09% Native American, 0.44% Asian, and 2.38% from two or more races. Hispanic or Latino of any race were 1.14% of the population.

There were 427 households, out of which 31.1% had children under the age of 18 living with them, 61.8% were couples living together and joined in either marriage or civil union, 5.9% had a female householder with no husband present, and 29.3% were non-families. 21.1% of all households were made up of individuals, and 9.4% had someone living alone who was 65 years of age or older. The average household size was 2.43 and the average family size was 2.82.

In the town, the population was spread out, with 21.0% under the age of 18, 9.6% from 18 to 24, 24.6% from 25 to 44, 25.3% from 45 to 64, and 19.6% who were 65 years of age or older. The median age was 41 years. For every 100 females, there were 91.2 males. For every 100 females age 18 and over, there were 90.3 males.

The median income for a household in the town was $34,453, and the median income for a family was $41,000. Males had a median income of $21,875 versus $24,375 for females. The per capita income for the town was $17,185. About 11.2% of families and 13.8% of the population were below the poverty line, including 15.4% of those under age 18 and 15.2% of those age 65 or over.

Town population reached its peak in 1860 with 1,413 people. It reached a low of 632 in 1970.

== Government ==
=== Town ===
- Moderator – Jeannine Young
- Selectboard – Bruce Urie, Jim Jones, Alison Blaney
- Town Clerk – Michelle Warren
- Treasurer – Michelle Warren
- Collector of Taxes – Nicole Jones
- Auditors – Ann Ingersol, Craig Taylor, Cheryl Bailey
- Listers – Jeremiah McCann, Harry Miller & Thomas Boyle
- Grand Juror – Carol Maroni
- Cemetery Commissioner – Bob Davis
- Tree Warden – Steve Moffatt
- Trustees of Public Funds – Rudy Chase, Carolyn Ryan & Michelle Warren
- Supervisor, Lamoille Solid Waste District – Penelope Doherty
- Budget – $1,116,584

=== State representatives ===
Craftsbury is represented in the Vermont General Assembly by two senators and two representatives, all elected for two-year terms.

For the purposes of representation in the House Craftsbury is part of the Orleans-Caledonia 1 district, which includes the towns of Barton, Glover, Sheffield, Wheelock, Albany Greensboro and Craftsbury. For 2009 and 2010 the representatives from this district were John Morley (a Republican) and John Rogers (a Democrat)

== Education ==
Craftsbury town is in the Orleans Southwest Supervisory Union school district.

Craftsbury is home to some uniquely small and historic educational institutions. Craftsbury Academy, located on Craftsbury Common is among the oldest and smallest public high schools in Vermont, and is part of the town's K–12 school system. Sterling College is nearby on Craftsbury Common and is a college of ecological thinking and action and is recognized as a Work College by the U.S. Department of Education.

=== Sterling College ===
Expand this section on Sterling College.

=== Public schools ===
Craftsbury runs the Craftsbury Schools System, which includes the historic Craftsbury Academy (grades 5–12), and Craftsbury Elementary (grades K–4). Craftsbury Schools is part of the Orleans Southwest Supervisory Union, which also operates five other public schools; Hardwick Elementary, Hazen Union High School, Lakeview Elementary, Wolcott Elementary, and Woodbury Elementary.

- Superintendent – Dr. David Baker
- FY 2020 Approved Budget – $3,951,349

== Culture ==
The Craftsbury Chamber Players have offered summer performances since 1966.

== Notable people ==
- Edwin Eugene Bagley, composer
- William A. Conant (1816–1909), member of the New York State Assembly; born in Craftsbury
- Samuel C. Crafts, US congressman and senator; 12th governor of Vermont; one of town's founders
- Roger L. Easton, principal inventor and designer of the Global Positioning System (GPS)
- Horace F. Graham, 56th governor of Vermont
- Joseph W. Hoyt, Wisconsin legislator
- Caroline Burnham Kilgore, first woman admitted to the Pennsylvania bar (1883)
- Bill "The Spaceman" Lee, pitcher with the Boston Red Sox (1969–1978) and Montreal Expos (1979–1982)
- Willard W. Miles, Associate Justice of the Vermont Supreme Court
- Leona May Smith (1914–1999), musician, co-founded and directed a summer music camp at Craftsbury, 1949–1957
- Burleigh F. Spalding (1853–1934), North Dakota lawyer, U.S. Representative, and Supreme Court Justice
- William Weston, politician who served in the Vermont Senate, lived and worked in Craftsbury

== Craftsbury in film ==
Alfred Hitchcock shot the scenery for his 1955 movie The Trouble with Harry in Craftsbury. Ostensibly, the movie takes place entirely in town. Exteriors of the parsonage beside the East Craftsbury Presbyterian Church are used as well as exterior shots of Craftsbury Common. Assuming that the town would be in full foliage, the company showed up for outdoor shots on September 27, 1954. To the filmmakers' shock, there was hardly any foliage left; to achieve a full effect, leaves were glued to the trees.

The 1976 IMAX film To Fly!, a history of human flight, directed by Jim Freeman and Greg MacGillivray and produced for the Smithsonian Institution's National Air and Space Museum opens with a hot air balloon passing over the Wee House and the United Church of Craftsbury on the Common.

== Economy ==
=== Tourist industry ===
The Craftsbury Outdoor Center has 105 kilometres (65 mi) of Nordic skiing trails, used for running in the summer months. The center is also home to the Green Racing Project, an Olympic development team with both rowing and skiing components.

In 1981, the first annual Craftsbury (winter) Marathon was held. In 2008, 646 skiers from 20 states and 3 provinces attended along with 295 tourists.

The Craftsbury Sculling Center is one of the oldest sculling programs in the United States, based on Little and Big Hosmer lake.

Agritourism is an important part of Craftsbury's economy. There are several farms, orchards, greenhouses and farmstands in Craftsbury, and there is a seasonal farmer's market at the Craftsbury Common every Saturday from 10am–1pm.

== Transportation ==
Vermont Route 14 passes through town near the villages of Craftsbury and Craftsbury Common.
