= Coventry (CDP), Vermont =

Census-designated place in Vermont, United States

Coventry, Vermont
- Census-designated place
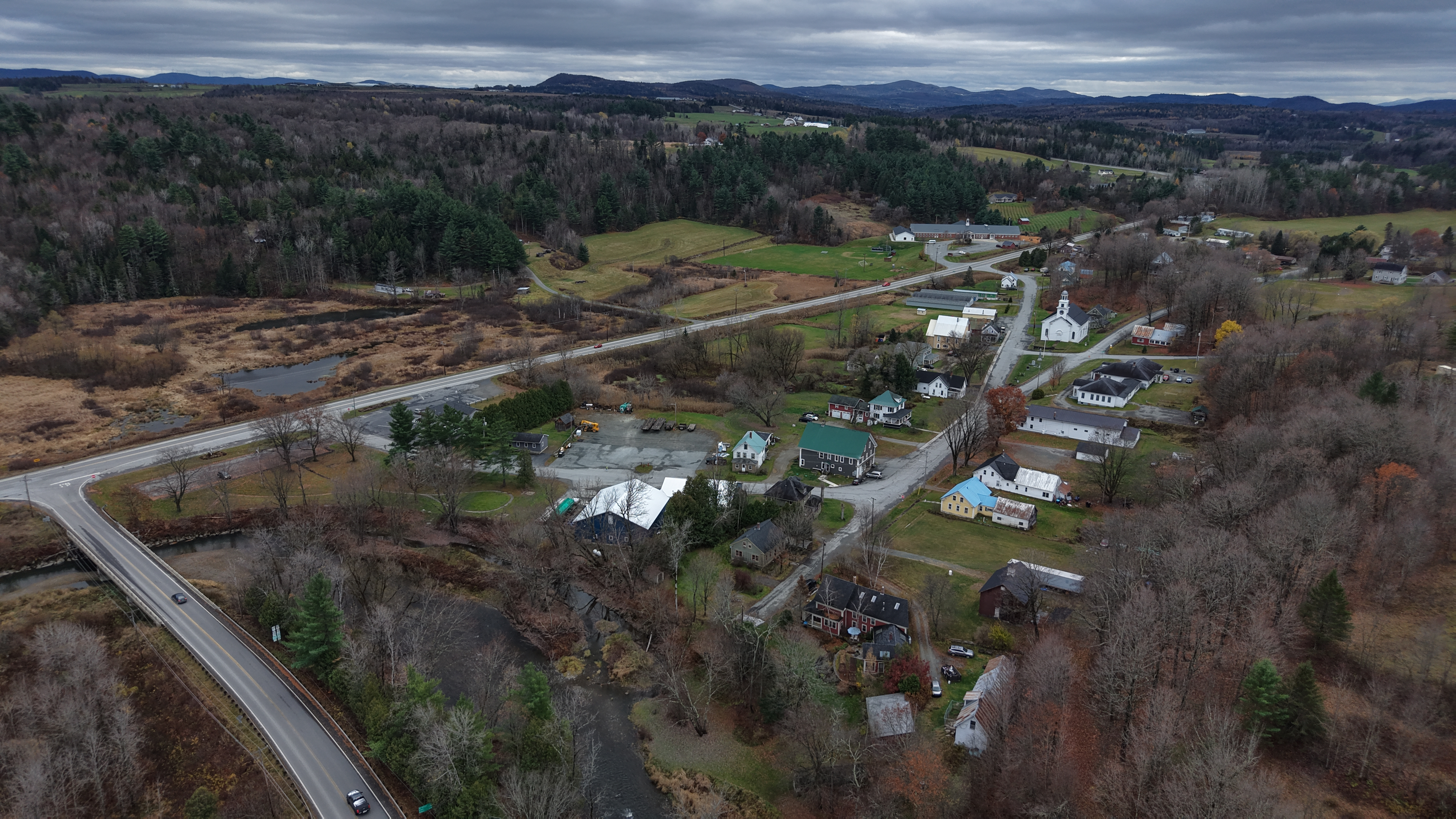

- Location within Vermont Location within the United States
- Coordinates: 44°51′58″N 72°16′04″W
- Country: United States
- State: Vermont
- County: Orleans
- Town: Coventry

Area
  - Total: 0.27 sq mi (0.71 km^{2})
  - Land: 0.26 sq mi (0.68 km^{2})
  - Water: 0.012 sq mi (0.03 km^{2})
- Elevation: 846 ft (258 m)

Population (2020)
  - Total: 111
- Time zone: UTC-5 (Eastern (EST))
  - Summer (DST): UTC-4 (EDT)
- ZIP Code: 05825
- Area code: 802
- FIPS code: 50-16075
- GNIS feature ID: 2586625

Coventry is the primary village and a census-designated place (CDP) in the town of Coventry, Orleans County, Vermont, United States. As of the 2020 census, it had a population of 111, out of 1,100 in the entire town of Coventry.

The CDP is in north-central Orleans County, along the southern edge of the town of Coventry. It is bordered to the south by the town of Irasburg. U.S. Route 5 runs along the eastern edge of the community, leading north 6 miles (10 km) to Newport and southeast the same distance to Orleans. Vermont Route 14 follows US 5 along the eastern edge of Coventry, but leads north 7 miles (11 km) to Newport Center and south 6 miles (10 km) to Irasburg.

The Black River flows northward along the western edge of the village; it continues north to enter Lake Memphremagog at Newport.
