= Harriet P. Dustan =

American physician (1920–1999)

Harriet Pearson Dustan
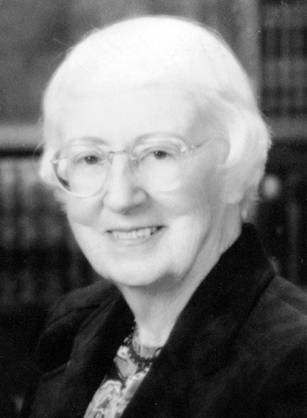
- Born: 1920; Craftsbury Common, Vermont
- Died: June 27, 1999 (aged 78–79)
- Education: University of Vermont
- Occupations: Physician and Cardiologist
- Years active: 1944–1990
- Employer(s): Cleveland Clinic; University of Alabama School of Medicine; United States Veterans Administration; University of Vermont
- Known for: Hypertension research and treatment
- Board member of: American Board of Internal Medicine; American Heart Association; American College of Physicians (ACP) Board of Regents
- Awards: American Medical Association's Scientific Achievement Award; Lifetime Achievement Award of the Council for High Blood Pressure Research; American College of Cardiology's Distinguished Service Award

Harriet Pearson Dustan (1920–1999) was an American physician who is known for her pioneering contributions to effective detection and treatment of hypertension. She was the first woman to serve on the Board of Governors of the American Board of Internal Medicine.

== Early life and education ==
Dustan was born in 1920 in Craftsbury Common, Vermont to Helen Paterson and William Lyon Dustan. She attended Craftsbury Academy for her primary and secondary education before receiving her Bachelors of Science (cum laude) and medical degrees from the University of Vermont. Following graduation, she received her training in internal medicine at Mary Fletcher Hospital, which is now the Medical Center Campus at Fletcher Allen Health Care, in Burlington Vermont. She then moved to Montreal to do her residency in internal medicine at Royal Victoria Hospital.

== Medical career ==
Following her residency, Dustan returned to Burlington in 1946 to help establish the medical student teaching program at Bishop DeGosbriand Hospital. In 1948, she moved to the Cleveland Clinic to work as a research fellow and in 1951 joined the staff of the Clinic's Research Division. She later became the Division's vice chairman from 1971 to 1977. Following her tenure as vice chairman, she moved to Alabama to join the faculty at University of Alabama at Birmingham as director of the Cardiovascular Research and Training Center and professor of medicine. Her contributions and leadership earned her the distinction of being named distinguished professor of the university in 1985. In 1987, she became 1 of 12 Distinguished Physicians (DP) of the United States Veterans Administration in their Department of Medicine and Surgery. The DP program was established in 1968 to attract doctors who had made significant contributions to medical science and have enjoyed long and distinguished careers. She retired from her position in 1990 and returned to Vermont, where she became a visiting professor of Pharmacology and Medicine at the University of Vermont College of Medicine.

Throughout her career, Dustan held a number of leadership and advisory positions, leaving a lasting footprint on the medical community. In 1973, she became the first woman on the Board of Governors of the American Board of Internal Medicine. She was also an active member of the American Heart Association from 1973 to 1979, serving as its second woman president (1977–1978), chairing its Ethics and Research Committees, and acting as the first editor-in-chief of its journal, Hypertension. She also served as a member of the Board of Regents of the American College of Physicians from 1979 to 1984 and on the Advisory Board of the NIH's National Heart, Lung, and Blood Institute, establishing national clinical practice guidelines.

== Research contributions ==
During her medical career, Dustan was involved in a series of innovations that have advanced the detection and treatment of hypertension. At the Cleveland Clinic, she worked in the Research Division with Drs. Irvine Page and Arthur C. Corcoran where she became a leading force in the field of hypertension. There, she was among the first to suggest that reducing dietary sodium could lower hypertension and risk for other cardiac disorders. In addition to recommendations for hypertension prevention, she advanced the medical field's understanding of the mechanisms underlying hypertension and helped develop early anti-hypertensive treatments. For instance, she studied the effects of serotonin in constricting blood vessels, which is now a treatment used in antidepressants. She also worked to characterize the role of the blood enzyme renin in hypertension—which is an often underdiagnosed cause of hypertension—and studied the effects of discontinuing anti-hypertensive medications in patients with hypertension. She was also a member of the team that established selective renal arteriography to track circulation in the kidneys and develop a reference standard by which to guide treatment and interventions. In so doing, her work transformed hypertension from a death sentence to a treatable disease.

== Legacy ==
Following her death on June 27, 1999, Dr. Edward D. Frohlich, a colleague and scientist at the Alton Ochsner Medical Foundation, noted Dr. Dustan's keen intellect, delightful sense of humor, and service to humanity. In 2008, the American Heart Association established the Harriet Dustan Award in her honor, which is presented to female investigators who have made outstanding contributions in the field of hypertension.

== Awards and honors ==
- American Medical Association's Scientific Achievement Award, 1988
- American College of Physicians John Phillips Memorial Award, 1977
- Honorary Degree, Doctor of Science, University of Vermont, 1977
- Honorary Degree, Doctor of Science, Cleveland State University, 1978
- Honorary Doctor of Science, Medical College of Wisconsin, 1986
- American College of Cardiology's Distinguished Service Award, 1998
- Lifetime Achievement Award of the Council for High Blood Pressure Research
