= Albany, Vermont =

- Town
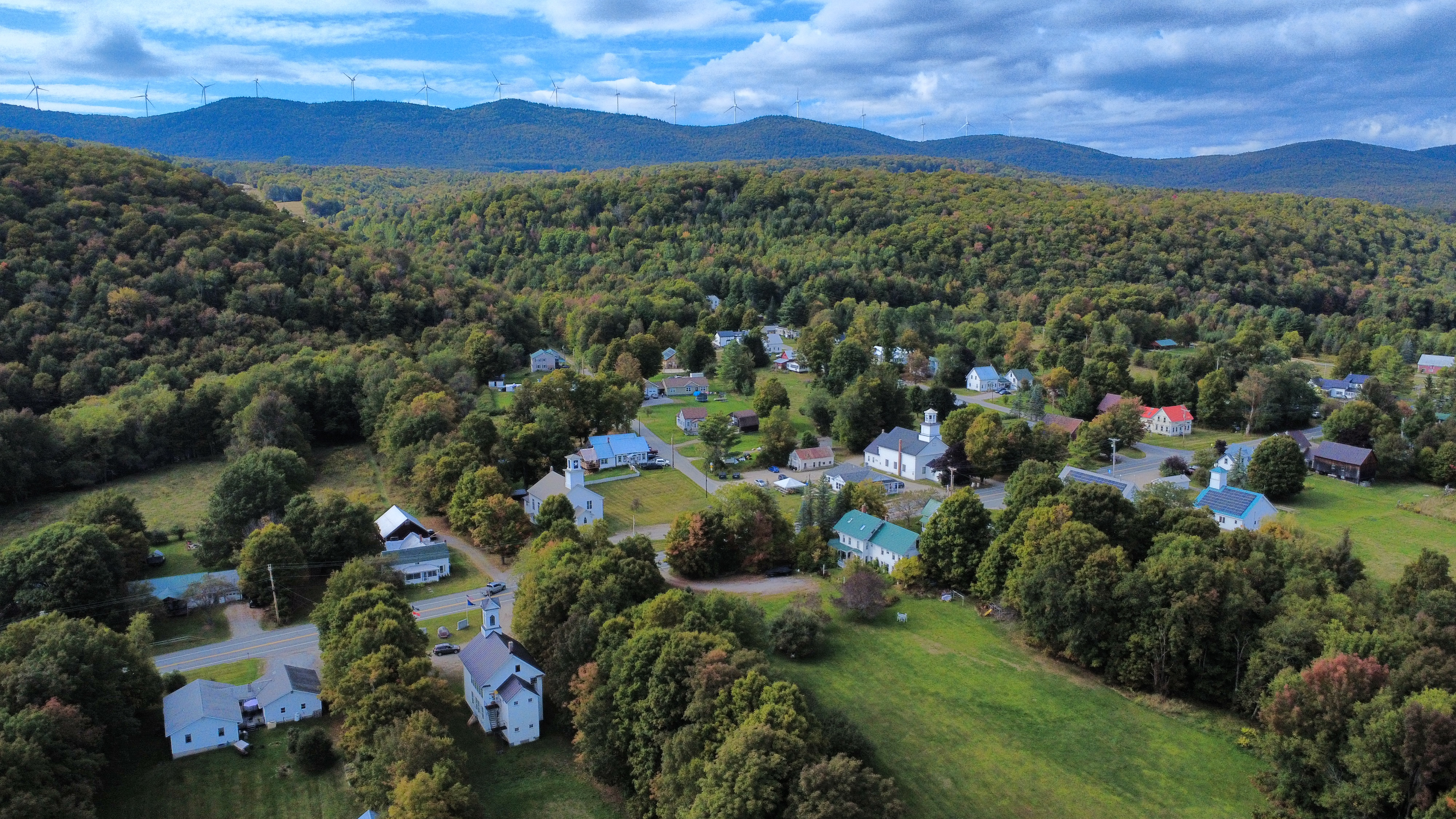
- Albany, VT, from the southeast

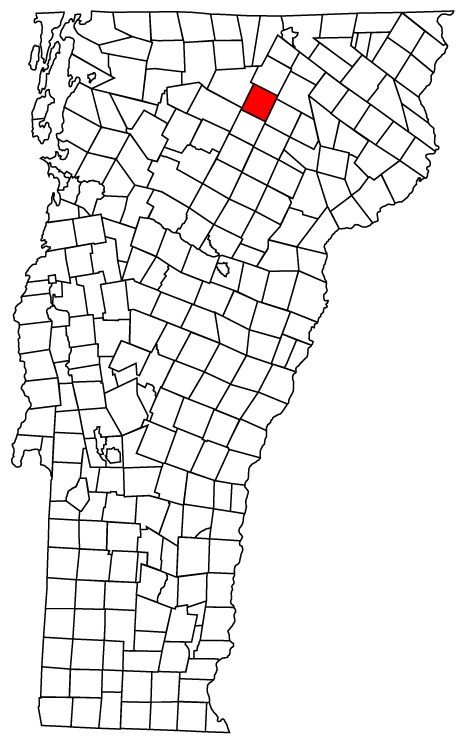
- Located in Orleans County, Vermont
- Coordinates: 44°44′26″N 72°20′17″W
- Country: United States
- State: Vermont
- County: Orleans
- Chartered: June 26, 1782
- Communities: Albany; Albany Center; East Albany; Merrill Corner; South Albany

Area
  - Total: 38.7 sq mi (100.2 km^{2})
  - Land: 38.5 sq mi (99.7 km^{2})
  - Water: 0.19 sq mi (0.5 km^{2})
- Elevation: 1,322 ft (403 m)

Population (2020)
  - Total: 976
  - Density: 25/sq mi (9.8/km^{2})
- Time zone: UTC-5 (EST)
  - Summer (DST): UTC-4 (EDT)
- ZIP Codes: 05820 (Albany); 05845 (Irasburg); 05875 (West Glover); 05827 (Craftsbury Common)
- Area code: 802
- FIPS code: 50-00475
- GNIS feature ID: 1462024

Albany is a town in Orleans County, Vermont, United States. The population was 976 at the 2020 census. Albany contains four villages: the incorporated village of Albany, and the unincorporated villages of Albany Center, East Albany and South Albany.

== History ==
The original land grant was given to Col. Antipas Gilman and associates on June 26, 1782, and was named "Lutterloh." In 1815, the name of the town was changed to "Albany."

Albany resident Rev. George Putnam was an Underground Railroad agent before the Civil War.

== Geography ==
According to the United States Census Bureau, the town has a total area of 38.7 square miles (100.2 km^{2}), of which 38.5 square miles (99.7 km^{2}) is land and 0.2 square mile (0.5 km^{2}) (0.52%) is water.

The town is hilly and uneven. The highest point in town is in the northwestern part of the township, which is cut off from the main chain of the Green Mountains by a brook. Lord's Creek flows north through the eastern part of the township, having several tributaries. There are other minor streams in town. There are also several ponds, the principal of which are Great Hosmer, Hartwell, Page, Heart, and Duck ponds.

The Black River flows north through Albany Village, crosses under the Water Street Bridge before emptying into Lake Memphremagog near Newport, Vermont, which is part of the St. Lawrence River Basin.

The rocks entering into the geological formation of the town are disposed in parallel ranges extending north and south. The westernmost of these contains a bed of talcose schist. Next is a narrow range of Upper Helderberg limestone, followed by a vein of clay slate, the residue of the territory being calciferous mica schist. In the central and eastern parts of the town there are several rich beds of muck and shell marl. There are also some ledges of granite rocks.

== Demographics ==
Historical population
| Census | Pop. | Note | %± |
|---|---|---|---|
| 1800 | 12 | | — |
| 1810 | 101 | | 741.7% |
| 1820 | 253 | | 150.5% |
| 1830 | 683 | | 170.0% |
| 1840 | 920 | | 34.7% |
| 1850 | 1,052 | | 14.3% |
| 1860 | 1,224 | | 16.3% |
| 1870 | 1,151 | | −6.0% |
| 1880 | 1,138 | | −1.1% |
| 1890 | 995 | | −12.6% |
| 1900 | 1,028 | | 3.3% |
| 1910 | 920 | | −10.5% |
| 1920 | 840 | | −8.7% |
| 1930 | 810 | | −3.6% |
| 1940 | 748 | | −7.7% |
| 1950 | 704 | | −5.9% |
| 1960 | 560 | | −20.5% |
| 1970 | 528 | | −5.7% |
| 1980 | 705 | | 33.5% |
| 1990 | 782 | | 10.9% |
| 2000 | 840 | | 7.4% |
| 2010 | 941 | | 12.0% |
| 2020 | 976 | | 3.7% |
U.S. Decennial Census

As of the census of 2000, there were 840 people, 337 households, and 237 families residing in the town. The population density was 21.8 people per square mile (8.4/km^{2}). There were 453 housing units at an average density of 11.8 per square mile (4.5/km^{2}). The racial makeup of the town was 97.50% White, 0.24% Black or African American, 0.60% Native American, 0.12% Pacific Islander, and 1.55% from two or more races. Hispanic or Latino of any race were 0.24% of the population.

There were 337 households, out of which 33.2% had children under the age of 18 living with them, 59.3% were married couples living together, 7.1% had a female householder with no husband present, and 29.4% were non-families. 24.6% of all households were made up of individuals, and 6.5% had someone living alone who was 65 years of age or older. The average household size was 2.49 and the average family size was 2.97.

In the town, the population was spread out, with 26.4% under the age of 18, 6.8% from 18 to 24, 27.0% from 25 to 44, 29.0% from 45 to 64, and 10.7% who were 65 years of age or older. The median age was 38 years. For every 100 females, there were 103.4 males. For every 100 females age 18 and over, there were 101.3 males.

== Economy ==
=== Personal income ===
The median income for a household in the town was $30,625, and the median income for a family was $33,750. Males had a median income of $26,094 versus $20,833 for females. The per capita income for the town was $15,287. About 14.3% of families and 15.3% of the population were below the poverty line, including 20.9% of those under age 18 and 8.4% of those age 65 or over.

=== Major route ===
- VT Route 14

== Cultural events ==
The Northeast Kingdom Music Festival held annual performances in Albany in the early 2000s. Attendance was limited to 2000.

== Notable person ==
- Willard W. Miles, Associate Justice of the Vermont Supreme Court

== See also ==
- Essex-Orleans Vermont Senate District, 2002–2012
- Orleans-Caledonia-1 Vermont Representative District, 2002–2012
