= Lewis J. Ingalls =

- Born: June 18, 1837; Boston, Massachusetts
- Died: December 31, 1913 (aged 76); Irasburg, Vermont
- Burial place: Irasburg Cemetery
- Military career
- Rank: Private
- Units: Company F, 8th Vermont Infantry
- Conflicts: American Civil War

Lewis J. Ingalls (June 18, 1837 – December 31, 1913) was a soldier in the Union Army during the American Civil War who received the Medal of Honor for his actions in fighting at Boutte Station when "A railroad train guarded by about 60 men on flat cars having been sidetracked by a misplaced switch into an ambuscade of guerrillas who were rapidly shooting down the unprotected guards, this soldier, under a severe fire in which he was wounded, ran to another switch and, opening it, enabled the train and the surviving guards to escape."

He enlisted in the 8th Vermont Infantry Regiment on November 2, 1861 and served in the regiment until it was mustered out of service on June 18, 1865. He was involved in fighting at Boutte Station, Louisiana, where he did the feat that would later earn him the Medal of Honor, and was wounded at the Battle of Opequon.

Ingalls was awarded the Medal of Honor on October 20, 1899. The Boston Herald once described him as the most fearless soldier in Vermont's history.

He died in Irasburg, Vermont on December 31, 1913.
