= Caroline Burnham Kilgore =

American lawyer and suffragist (1838–1909)

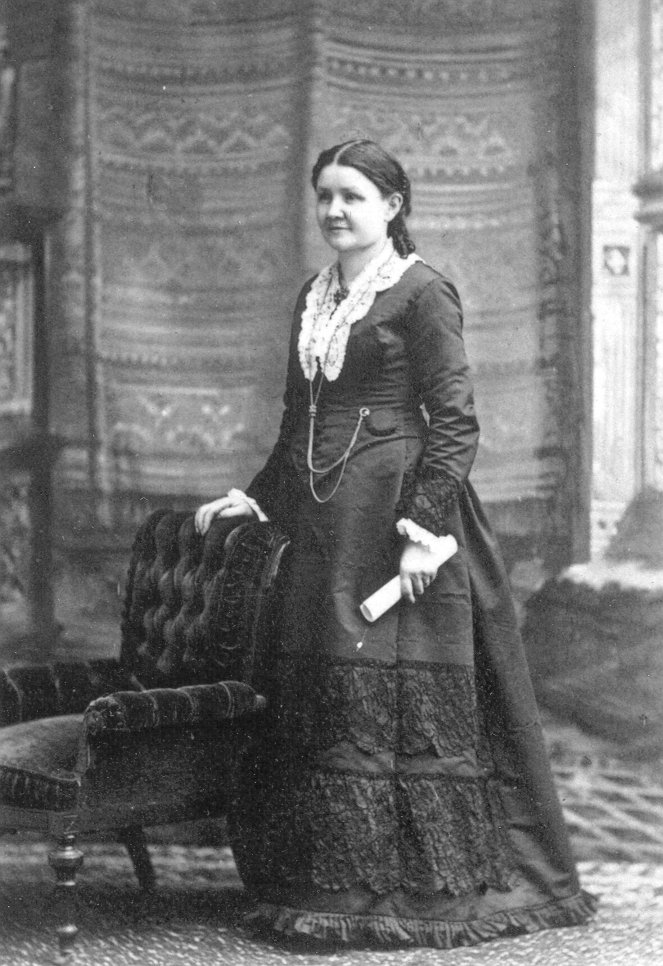
- Born: Caroline Burnham; January 20, 1838; Craftsbury, Vermont, U.S.
- Died: June 29, 1909 (aged 71); Swarthmore, Pennsylvania, U.S.
- Education: Hygeio-Therapeutic College (MD); University of Pennsylvania Law School (JD)
- Occupation: Attorney

Caroline Burnham Kilgore (January 20, 1838 – June 29, 1909) was the first woman to graduate from: (A) a medical school and be granted an M.D. (in 1865) in New York State and (B) from University of Pennsylvania Law School and be admitted to the orphan's court bar (in 1881) in the Commonwealth of Pennsylvania. She became the first woman lawyer in Pennsylvania.

== Early life ==
Caroline "Carrie" Burnham was born in Craftsbury, Vermont, in 1838. Her father, James Burnham, was a woolen manufacturer while her mother Eliza Arnold Burnham was a former teacher. She was orphaned at the age of 11. She attended the Craftsbury Common District School from the ages of 4 to 12.

She supported herself as a domestic worker and, starting in 1853, as a schoolteacher. While working as a teacher, Kilgore continued her education at Craftsbury Academy and Newbury Seminary.

== Medical career ==
Kilgore moved to Wisconsin and taught grammar school and high school at Sun Prairie, Madison, and Evansville, where she was preceptor at the Evansville Seminary and Normal School. She moved to New York City in 1863 and enrolled in medical school at the Hygeio-Therapeutic College. She completed her M.D. in 1865, becoming the first woman to receive a doctorate in medicine in New York State. She was a member of the first class of women admitted to clinical study at Bellevue Hospital. After several months studying and working as a physician's assistant in Boston, she moved to Philadelphia in September 1865. She purchased a finishing school and ran it for four years before switching to a legal career in 1869.

== Law career ==
The University of Pennsylvania Law School rejected Kilgore's application in 1871. She attempted to buy individual tickets to attend lectures. Sometime later, she sent her husband to purchase the lecture passes, but the Board of Trustees informed her that even if she attended every required lecture and passed all of the examinations, they would not guarantee that she would earn a diploma. After studying privately, Kilgore asked to take the bar exam in 1873 and 1874, but was refused. The dean of the law school stated in a letter that he would resign if the day came when Black people or women gained admittance.

After ten years of lobbying, Kilgore finally became the first woman admitted to the University of Pennsylvania Law School in 1881, graduating in 1883. She obtained immediate admission to the Orphan’s Court of Philadelphia, but she had to engage in yet another lobbying campaign to gain admittance to practice before the Pennsylvania courts of common pleas in 1884, the Supreme Court of Pennsylvania in 1885, and the U.S. Supreme Court in 1890.

Active in the women's suffrage movement, Kilgore sought to vote at city and county elections in 1871. She was ruled against and appealed to the full state supreme court, which affirmed the ruling against her. She published a pamphlet with her argument before the state supreme court, titled Woman Suffrage. The Argument of Carrie S. Burnham, which included the opinion of the man who originally ruled against her, George Sharswood. Kilgore served on the advisory committee and as a vice president of the National Woman Suffrage Association and spoke at national suffrage conventions.

== Personal life and death ==
Carrie Burnham and Damon Kilgore (1827–1888) married in 1876. The couple had two daughters, Carrie and Fanny. She died in Swarthmore, Pennsylvania, on June 29, 1909, and was buried at Craftsbury Common Cemetery in Craftsbury, Vermont.

== Legacy ==
During the University of Pennsylvania's Homecoming Weekend of October 1965, the Trustees dedicated Kilgore House, one of the four houses in the Robert C. Hill Residence Hall, in her honor.

In 2024, a historical marker honoring her was unveiled at 1301 Baltimore Pike, Springfield, Pennsylvania.

Kilgore is listed as one of the Philadelphia Bar Association’s Legends of the Bar.

== See also ==
- List of first women lawyers and judges in Pennsylvania
