= Newport, Vermont =

Newport, Vermont may refer to:

- Newport (town), Vermont
- Newport (city), Vermont
