= Senator Locke =

Senator Locke may refer to:

- David H. Locke (1927–2019), Massachusetts State Senate
- Francis Locke Jr. (1776–1823), elected as a U.S. Senator from North Carolina in 1814, but resigned before qualifying
- Harry M. Locke (1902–1974), Colorado State Senate
- James William Locke (1837–1922), Florida State Senate
- John Locke (Massachusetts politician) (1764–1855), Massachusetts State Senate
- Mamie Locke (born 1954), Virginia State Senate
- Matthew Locke (North Carolina politician) (1730–1801), North Carolina State Senate
- Matthew Fielding Locke (1824–1911), Texas State Senate
- Orrin Wiley Locke (1859–1951), Vermont State Senate
