= Irasburg (CDP), Vermont =

Census-designated place in Vermont, United States

Irasburg, Vermont
- Census-designated place
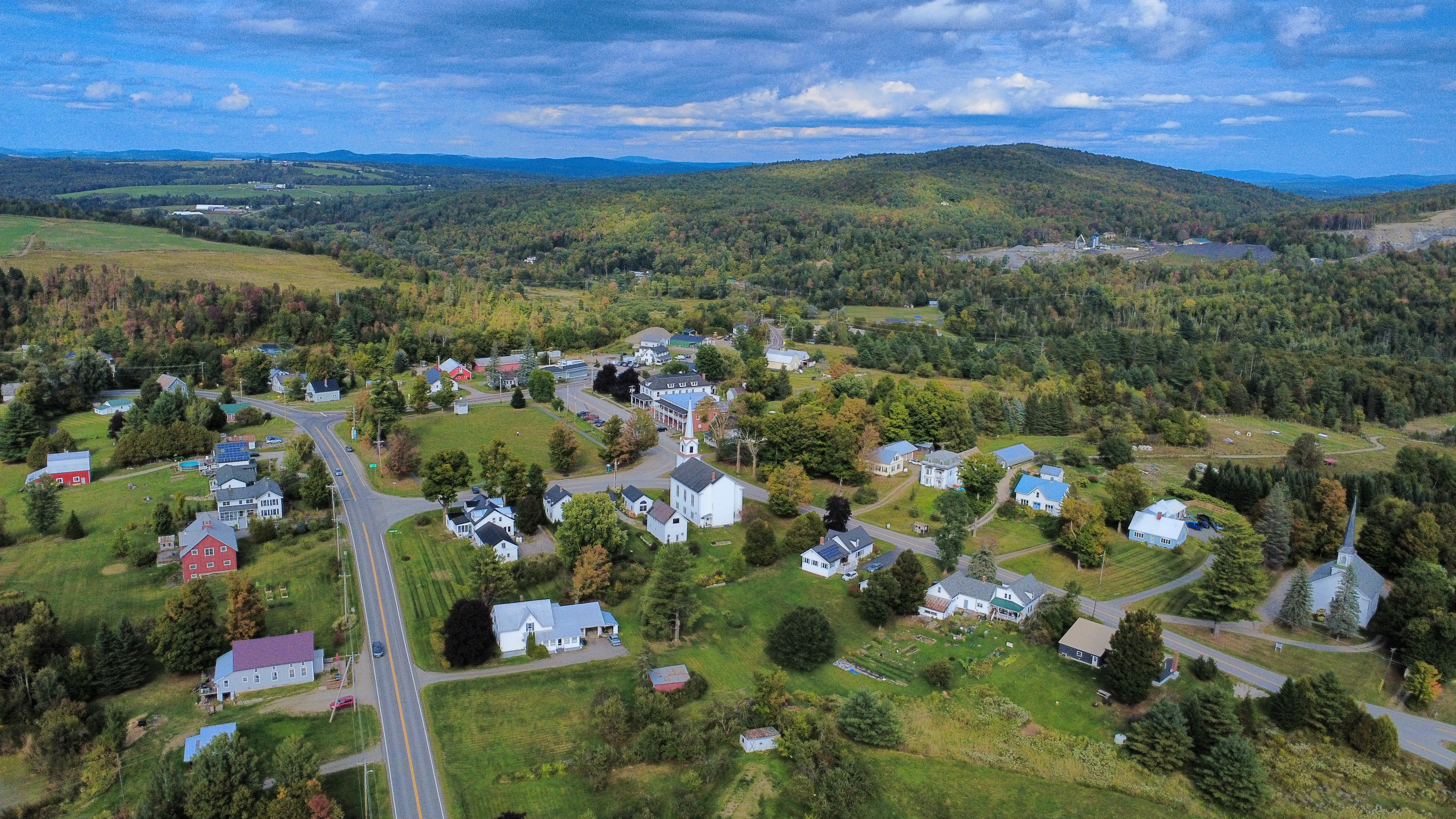
- Irasburg, VT, from the southwest

- Location within Vermont Location within the United States
- Coordinates: 44°48′01″N 72°17′06″W
- Country: United States
- State: Vermont
- County: Orleans
- Town: Irasburg

Area
  - Total: 1.00 sq mi (2.59 km^{2})
  - Land: 0.98 sq mi (2.54 km^{2})
  - Water: 0.015 sq mi (0.04 km^{2})
- Elevation: 883 ft (269 m)

Population (2020)
  - Total: 159
- Time zone: UTC-5 (Eastern (EST))
  - Summer (DST): UTC-4 (EDT)
- ZIP Code: 05845
- Area code: 802
- FIPS code: 50-35500
- GNIS feature ID: 2586641

Irasburg is the primary village and a census-designated place (CDP) in the town of Irasburg, Orleans County, Vermont, United States. As of the 2020 census, it had a population of 159, out of 1,233 in the entire town of Irasburg.

The CDP is in central Orleans County, south of the geographic center of the town. The Black River, a tributary of Lake Memphremagog, flows through the community, passing north of the village center which is sited on a hilltop.

Vermont Route 14 passes through the village, leading north 5 miles (8 km) to Coventry and southwest 7 miles (11 km) to Albany. Vermont Route 58 joins Route 14 in the village center but leads east 4 miles (6 km) to Orleans and west 9 miles (14 km) to Lowell. Newport, the county seat, is 11 miles (18 km) to the northeast of Irasburg.
