= Black River (Lake Memphremagog) =

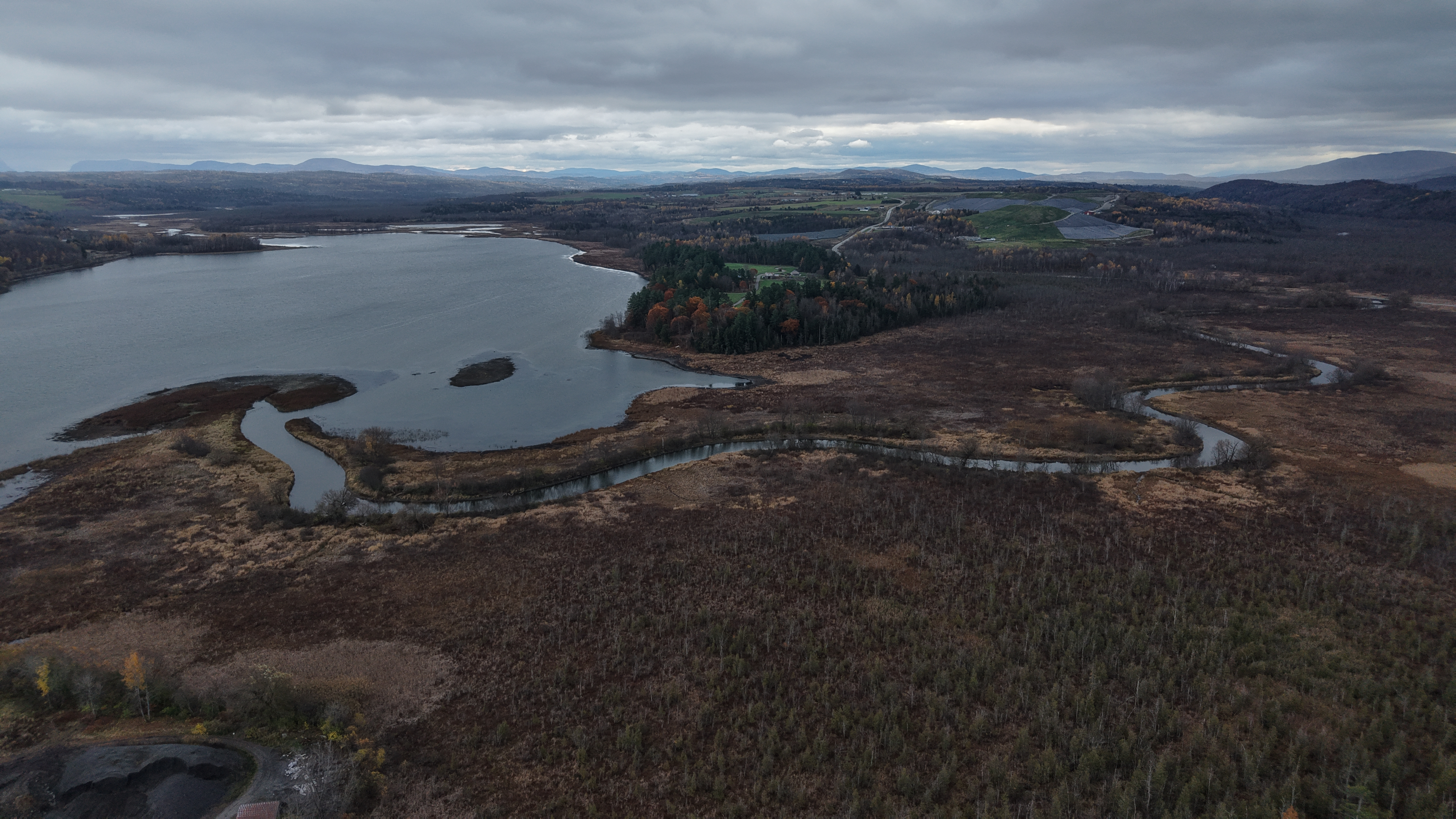
- Mouth of the Black River in Newport, VT

Location
- Country: United States
- State: Vermont
- Region: Northeast Kingdom
- City: Newport, Vermont

Physical characteristics
- Source: Lake Elligo
  - location: Craftsbury, Vermont, Orleans County, Vermont, United States
  - coordinates: 44°36′3″N 72°21′22″W
  - elevation: 872 ft (266 m)
- Mouth: Lake Memphremagog
  - location: Newport (city), Vermont, Orleans County, Vermont, United States
  - coordinates: 44°56′39″N 72°12′16″W
  - elevation: 682 ft (208 m)
- Length: 30 mi (48 km)
- Basin size: 134 mi^{2} (350 km^{2})
- Discharge
  - location: Newport city, Vermont

Basin features
- Tributaries
  - left: (from the mouth), Stony Brook, Ware Brook, Stony Hill Brook, Lamphear Brook, McCleary Brook, Shalney Branch, Regers Branch, Seaver Branch, Mud Pond discharge, Lake Elligo discharge
  - right: (from the mouth), Allen Brook, Lords Creek, Heart Pond discharge, Little Homer Pond discharge

The Black River is a tributary of Lake Memphremagog, over 30 miles (48 km) long, in northern Vermont in the United States. It is one of the four major rivers in Orleans County. It is the longer but least powerful of the two rivers contained solely within the county. There are no longer any damsites.

It is paralleled much of the way by Vermont Route 14, taking advantage of the terrain of the Black River Valley.

== Course ==
The Black River is 26 miles (42 km) in length, originates east of Great Hosmer Pond with headwater tributaries flowing west off Ames Hill in Albany. It drains 134 square miles (347 km^{2}) of land. This river has the lowest gradient of the three main rivers in the basin with an average slope of about 8 feet (2.4 m) per 1 mile (1.6 km). The Black River watershed contains over 600 acres (243 ha) of lakes and ponds, the three largest being Elligo Pond, Little Hosmer Pond and Great Hosmer Pond.

The current is slow. The drop from the source to Lake Memphremagog, including the falls at Irasburg and Coventry, is 190 feet (58 m).

=== Albany (starts) ===
The Black River, after beginning on the east side of Great Hosmer Pond in the southern portion of the town of Albany. It flows south-southwesterly through a relatively narrow valley.

=== Craftsbury ===
It continues in a generally southerly flow into the town of Craftsbury entering a wider valley east of Duck Pond. Whitney Brook, and then the drainage from Little Hosmer and Great Hosmer Ponds, join the river. It meanders further south then is confined briefly just north of Craftsbury village. South of Craftsbury village, the river reverses course and flows northwesterly with Lake Elligo outlet stream joining the river from the east. The river twists and turns its way north through a broad valley, which contains many significant floodplain and wetland communities (see section below). The river flows the length of the town of Craftsbury.

The river drains Lake Elligo. The Black River is the main river in town and is the northern drain from that lake. The river was called Elligo-sigo by the natives.

The western branch of the Black River proceeds northwest from Elligo Lake. In about .5 miles (0.8 km), Whetstone Brook enters into it from the east. Within 1 mile (1.6 km), it is joined by the eastern branch of the river.

The eastern branch of the Black River exits Hosmer Pond towards the southeast. About a mile after leaving the pond, it is joined by Whitney Brook entering from the northeast. Within 1 mile (1.6 km) it turns south, then curves around to the west, then heads northwest to join its western branch.

The conjoined river proceeds northwest. In .5 miles (0.8 km), it is joined by Cass Brook entering from the south. In a little over 1 mile (1.6 km), it is joined by a brook entering from the south, draining Mud Pond.

The river curves north, then northeast. It is joined by a brook draining Page Pond from the northeast. It then turns northwest and back northeast again. It is joined by a small brook entering from the northwest, on the Albany line.

=== Albany (the second time) ===
The Black River flows through the central part of the town from south to north, having a number of quite considerable tributaries. It continues meandering in a more northeasterly fashion on the western side of Great Hosmer Pond. It winds through Albany and into Irasburg east of Potters Pond.

The river continues northeast through Albany. It curves east and is joined by Rogers Brook entering from the north.

It turns northeast again, and is joined by McLeary Brook entering from the north. The river turns east again, then back northeast. It meanders, then turns east and Lamphean Brook enters from the north. The river then crosses into Irasburg.

=== Irasburg ===
The Black river is the principal water-course. It flows through the town in a northerly direction, receiving a number of small streams. The current is generally slow. It enters east of Potters Pond. It continues its tortuous route northeast and then east to the village of Irasburg. Just upstream of the village, the very sinuous Lords Creek enters. This creek is about 10 miles (16 km) long and drains a watershed that is 17 square miles (44 km^{2}). Downstream of Irasburg, the Black River continues north in a narrower valley with less meandering. It then flows into the town of Coventry.

The river continues in a northeasterly direction. When Lords Creek enters it from the east, the river turns westerly. It resumes its northeasterly course and Brigham Brook drains into it.

It turns north. When Allen Brook empties into it, the river turns northwest.

Lord's Creek enters it from the southeast, about .5 miles (0.8 km) beyond the village of Irasburg. The river proceeds in a northern direction about two miles (3 km) and crosses into Coventry.

=== Coventry ===
The Black River follows an east-northeasterly course through the central part of Coventry, until it joins the South Bay of Lake Memphremagog in Newport. For about the last 4.7 miles (7.6 km), the river is part of the state's South Bay Wildlife Management Area.

Just after crossing into Coventry, the river is intersected by Ware Brook. A half a mile north, Stony Brook enters. As US Route 5 starts to parallel it, there are falls of 25 feet (8 m) in two tiers. From there the river proceeds north to enter Lake Memphremagog from the west side of the South Bay.

=== Newport city ===
The river enters Lake Memphremagog in the extreme eastern part of the town, near the village, in the South Bay

== History ==
=== Dams ===
In 1883, there were several saw mills and a grist mills in Irasburg.

=== List of cities and towns ===
In upstream order:

- Newport, Vermont
- Coventry, Vermont
- Irasburg, Vermont
- Albany, Vermont
- Craftsbury, Vermont

== See also ==
- List of rivers of Vermont

== References and external links ==
- Map of Black River
- Report on the Geology of Vermont
- Report of the State Geologist on the Mineral Industries
- retrieved July 17, 2008
