= Irasburg Town Hall =

- U.S. National Register of Historic Places
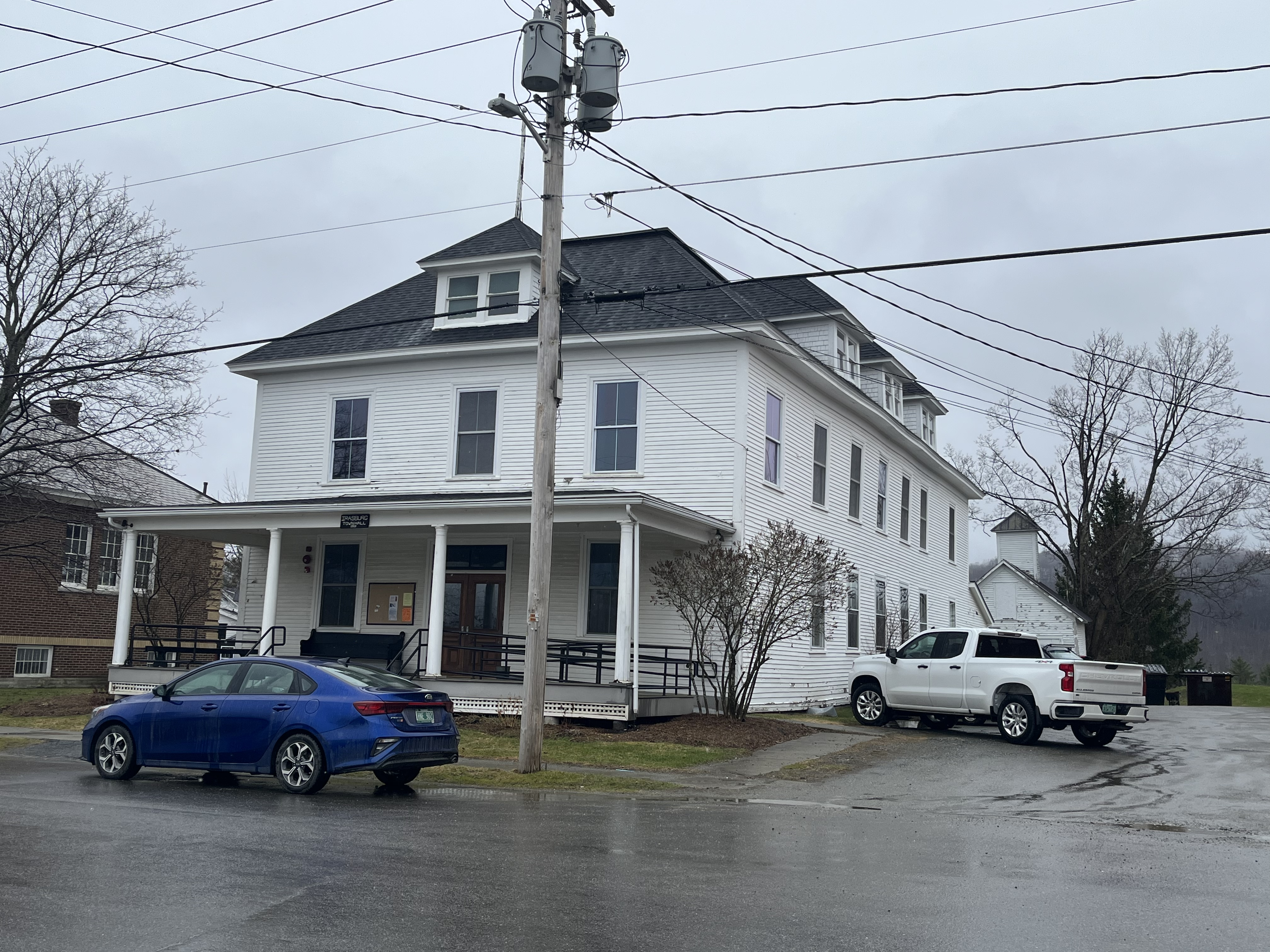

- Location within Vermont Location within the United States
- Location: Park Ave., Irasburg Square, Irasburg, Vermont
- Coordinates: 44°48′9″N 72°16′43″W
- Area: less than one acre
- Built: 1911
- Architect: C. D. Story
- MPS: Historic Government Buildings MPS
- NRHP reference No.: 94001334
- Added to NRHP: November 21, 1994

Irasburg Town Hall is the center of the town government of Irasburg, Vermont. Built in 1911, it is located facing Irasburg Square on the site of original county courthouse of Orleans County, of which Irasburg was the shire town of until 1884. The town hall is a prominent local civic and social venue, its auditorium featuring fine painted backdrops. It was listed on the National Register of Historic Places in 1994.

== Description and history ==
Irasburg Town Hall occupies a prominent position in the center of Irasburg village, on the east side of Irasburg Square, between the public library and the general store. It is a 2 1/2-story wood-frame structure, with a dormered hip roof and clapboarded exterior. Its front facade is three bays wide, with a single-story porch extending across the front, with tapered round columns supporting a hip roof. The main entrance opens into a foyer that has stairs leading up at the sides, and provides access to a dining hall and kitchen on the ground floor. The upper-level houses an auditorium with stage at the far end, and a vaulted ceiling created by arched panels. Among the theatrical fixtures are five painted backdrops, created by local artists and depicting scenes of northern Vermont.

The hall was built in 1911, and is stylistically similar to a typical American Foursquare house, except on a larger scale. It was built on the site of the former county courthouse, which was destroyed by fire in 1910. In addition to housing civic functions, the hall has been home to traveling and local theatrical productions, social events such as weddings and dinners. Its use for such functions declined in the 1970s but has since been revived.

== See also ==
- National Register of Historic Places listings in Orleans County, Vermont
