= Coventry, Vermont =

- Town
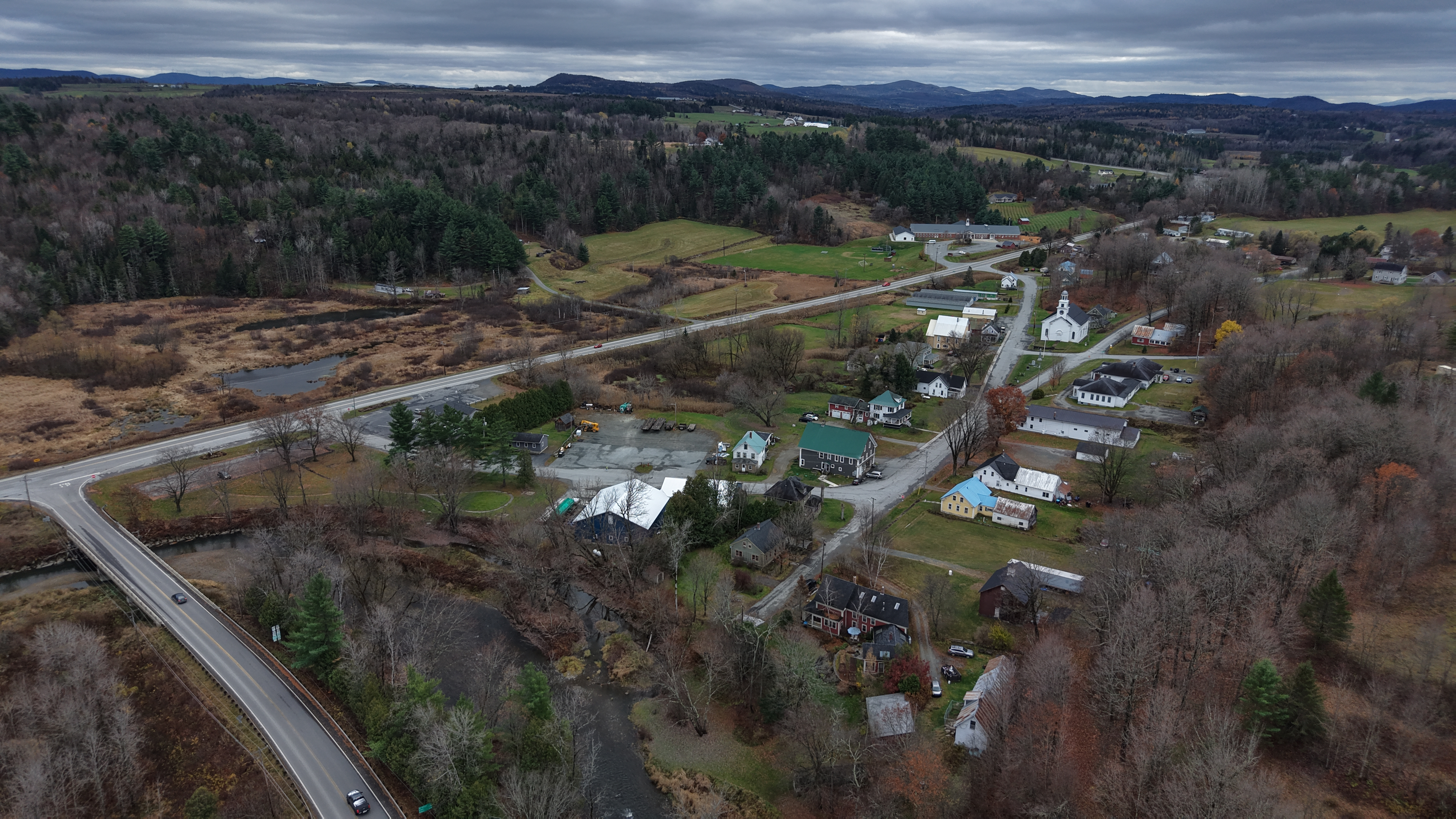
- Coventry, VT, from the north

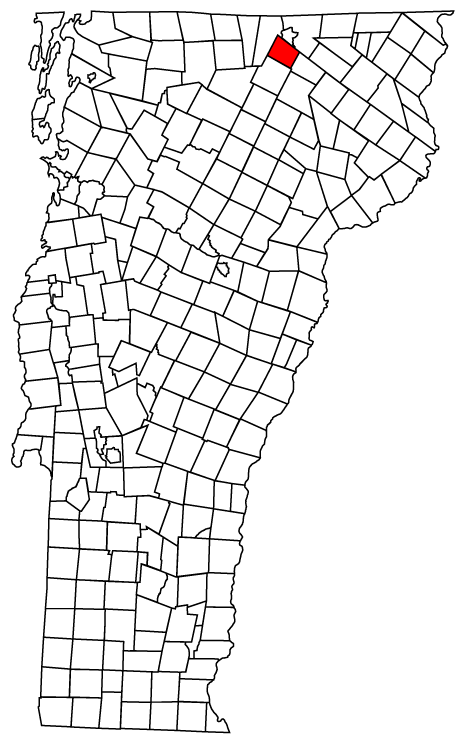
- Located in Orleans County, Vermont
- Coordinates: 44°52′24″N 72°14′16″W
- Country: United States
- State: Vermont
- County: Orleans
- Organized: July 7, 1920
- Communities: Coventry

Area
  - Total: 27.7 sq mi (71.7 km^{2})
  - Land: 27.5 sq mi (71.1 km^{2})
  - Water: 0.23 sq mi (0.6 km^{2})
- Elevation: 922 ft (281 m)

Population (2020)
  - Total: 1,100
  - Density: 40/sq mi (15.5/km^{2})
- Time zone: UTC-5 (EST)
  - Summer (DST): UTC-4 (EDT)
- ZIP Codes: 05825 (Coventry); 05855 (Newport); 05860 (Orleans)
- Area code: 802
- FIPS code: 50-16150
- GNIS feature ID: 1462077
- Website: coventryvt.org

Coventry /ˈkɒvəntri/ is a town in Orleans County, Vermont, United States. The population was 1,100 at the 2020 census.

== History ==
=== Etymology ===
Coventry was named for the birthplace of one of the founders, Major Elias Buel, who was born in Coventry, Connecticut.

=== Post bellum ===
A record exists from 1860, showing that the "Artillery Company" of the 3rd Regiment mustered for annual drill on June 5. An inventory shows they possessed one six pound brass cannon.

In 1861, the 3rd Vermont Infantry, Company B, was recruited in part from Coventry.

In the September 9, 1977, episode of Hee Haw, Coventry was saluted for its population of 300.

=== Coventry festival ===
In 2004, what was billed as the final concert of the band Phish was held in Coventry on August 14–15. The concert was the single largest gathering of people in the town's history. Some fans had to be turned back due to heavy rains. Even so, with 65,000 attendees Coventry's augmented population was the largest in the state at that time, outranking Burlington, Vermont, which had around 39,000 people in the 2000 census.

The Phish concert was a two-day event (August 14–15, 2004), held at the Newport State Airport. People began arriving early Friday morning and shortly after the roads became congested. On Friday morning, it had rained. The soft land in the parking area had turned to mud. Cars were then turned away. Instead of driving home, they parked their cars on the median of Interstate 91, choosing to walk the rest of the way to the concert.

Dozens of pairs of shoes, sandals, and boots were lost due to the thick mud. On Sunday, at the end of the concert, tractors were brought over to help pull cars out of the mud.

== Geography ==
According to the United States Census Bureau, the town has a total area of 27.7 square miles (71.7 km^{2}), of which 27.5 square miles (71.1 km^{2}) is land and 0.2 square mile (0.6 km^{2}) (0.80%) is water. It contains the smallest area of any town in the county. However, the city of Newport is smaller in area. The village of Coventry is in the southern part of the town.

The Black River flows an east-northeasterly course through the central part of the town until it joins the South Bay of Lake Memphremagog in Newport. For approximately the last 4.7 miles (7.6 km), the river is part of the state's South Bay Wildlife Management Area.

South Bay Wildlife Management Area is located mostly in Coventry but also in the adjacent town of Newport at the southern part of Lake Memphremagog. This is a large wetland and floodplain forest, red maple and white cedar swamp, along the Black River.

The Barton River flows through Coventry, east of the Black River, and then into Lake Memphremagog.

== Demographics ==
Historical population
Census	Pop.	Note	%±
1800	7		—
1810	178		2,442.9%
1820	282		58.4%
1830	729		158.5%
1840	796		9.2%
1850	867		8.9%
1860	914		5.4%
1870	914		0.0%
1880	911		−0.3%
1890	879		−3.5%
1900	728		−17.2%
1910	616		−15.4%
1920	668		8.4%
1930	610		−8.7%
1940	549		−10.0%
1950	497		−9.5%
1960	458		−7.8%
1970	492		7.4%
1980	674		37.0%
1990	806		19.6%
2000	1,014		25.8%
2010	1,086		7.1%
2020	1,100		1.3%
U.S. Decennial Census

As of the census of 2000, there were 1,014 people, 379 households, and 286 families residing in the town. The population density was 36.9 people per square mile (14.3/km^{2}). There were 435 housing units at an average density of 15.8 per square mile (6.1/km^{2}). The racial makeup of the town was 97.63% White, 0.30% African American, 0.99% Native American, 0.10% Asian, and 0.99% from two or more races. Hispanic or Latino of any race were 0.89% of the population.

There were 379 households, out of which 35.4% had children under the age of 18 living with them, 57.3% were married couples living together, 11.6% had a female householder with no husband present, and 24.3% were non-families. 17.2% of all households were made up of individuals, and 5.0% had someone living alone who was 65 years of age or older. The average household size was 2.68 and the average family size was 2.96.

In the town, the population was spread out, with 26.8% under the age of 18, 8.7% from 18 to 24, 29.1% from 25 to 44, 25.9% from 45 to 64, and 9.5% who were 65 years of age or older. The median age was 36 years. For every 100 females, there were 102.8 males. For every 100 females age 18 and over, there were 96.3 males.

== Government ==
A waste system company paid the town about $800,000 in "tipping fees" in 2009. This allows the town municipal property tax rate to be zero. However, the town still pays school taxes.

=== Town Officials ===
- Moderator – Matt Maxwell
- Selectboard Chair – Mike Marcotte
- Selectman – David Gallup
- Selectman – Scott Briere
- Selectboard Clerk – Amanda Carlson
- Town Clerk – Deb Tanguay
- Treasurer – David Barlow
- Delinquent Tax Collector – Kate Fletcher
- Planning Commission Members
  - Maurice Jacobs, Chairman
  - Joshua Griffes, Vice Chairman
  - Phil Marquette
  - Robert "Skip" Gosselin
  - Michael Lucas
- Assessing Clerk – Kate Fletcher
- Road Commissioner – David Gallup
- Town Administrator – Amanda Carlson

=== School District ===
- School Board
  - Matthew Maxwell, Chairman
  - Daniel Prue
  - Amanda Jensen
  - Jamie Stenger
  - Kathleen Ahearn
- Principal
  - Todd Rohlen, 2018–present
  - Matthew Baughman, 2012–2018
- Budget – $3,201,648.39

== Economy ==
=== Personal income ===
The median income for a household in the town was $33,487, and the median income for a family was $37,500. Males had a median income of $26,528 versus $18,250 for females. The per capita income for the town was $13,788. About 11.9% of families and 17.2% of the population were below the poverty line, including 23.8% of those under age 18 and 11.7% of those age 65 or over.

=== Industry ===
The Washington Electric Coöperative has four electric generators at Vermont's largest landfill in Coventry. The methane generation facility provides a third to one half of WEC's members’ electricity needs. This facility supplies power to 6,000 households and businesses. In 2008, the co-op applied to expand the plant to eight megawatts. This increase is expected to cost $3 million.

The New England Waste Services of Vermont (Waste USA), a subsidiary of Casella Waste Systems, owns the landfill which serves much of Vermont. In 2013, it was allowed to accept up to 370,000 short tons (340,000 t) of waste annually.

== Infrastructure ==
=== Airport ===
The town is served by the Northeast Kingdom International Airport (ICAO: KEFK), formerly called Newport State Airport. It contains one runway, 18–36, measuring 5,300 feet (1,600 m), and one runway, 5–23, measuring 4,000 feet (1,200 m). The FBO is Lakeview Aviation which is owned and operated by Daniel Gauvin.

=== Water ===
Coventry Fire District Number One operates the water system which supplies the (unincorporated) Village of Coventry. A Prudential Committee runs the fire district. Under Vermont law, this is a municipality; the committee is the equivalent of a town select board.

== Cultural activities ==
The Vermont Roots Reggae Fest has been held here the last Saturday in August for several years. It was attended by 2000 people in 2006. Past problems with unruly crowds and drugs have been addressed by the organizers.

== Notable people ==
- Harry A. Black, Secretary of State of Vermont
- Orrin Wiley Locke, Member of the Vermont Senate
- Michael J. Marcotte, Member of the Vermont House of Representatives
- Lambert Packard, Architect
- Timothy P. Redfield, Associate Justice of the Vermont Supreme Court
