= Elias P. Bailey =

American politician (1832–1881)

Elias P. Bailey was a member of the Wisconsin State Assembly.

== Biography ==
Bailey was born on December 17, 1832, in Irasburg, Vermont. He married Lucinda A. McCarty. They would have four children. Bailey died on October 16, 1881.

== Career ==
Bailey was a member of the Assembly during the 1872 session. Additionally, he was Chairman (similar to Mayor), Treasurer and Assessor of Lucas, Wisconsin. He was a Republican.
