= Craftsbury Schools =

Public school system in Craftsbury, Vermont

Craftsbury Schools is the public school system serving students from the town of Craftsbury, Vermont, a town on the southern tip of Orleans County. The school includes grades kindergarten through twelve, along with a number of tuition students from neighboring towns in grades seven through twelve. The main campus is located on Craftsbury Common, though the school system maintains an elementary school in the village nearby.

Historically, the town had almost a dozen small one-room schoolhouses scattered around the town, all of which are closed today. Separately, Craftsbury Academy began in a brick building on Craftsbury Common in the 1820s, making it the oldest continually-operated public high school in Vermont and among the oldest in the nation. The elementary schools and the academy were consolidated over time into the current arrangement as a K-12 public school system.

The school is the smallest K-12 school system in Vermont.

As of the 2010-2011 school year a major renovation of the campus began, the smallest proposal in a series of proposed renovations which were rejected by the voters due partly to high costs.

The school had a total enrollment of just over 160 students in the 2010-2011 school year, and is slowly declining in size at a rate similar to the overall state decline. In spite of its small size the school offers a comprehensive K-12 education comparable for the most part to many larger area schools, attested to by standardized test scores which are generally in line with state averages. Concerns remain about high per student costs among some community members.

The principal is Merri Greenia.

== School board ==
- Steve Moffatt, Chair
- Julie Marckres
- Jen Lescouzec
- Harry Miller
- John Smith

== Craftsbury Elementary School ==
The elementary school serves grades kindergarten through four, and is housed in a small school in the Craftsbury Village, located about one mile from the main campus on Craftsbury Common.

As of the 2010-2011 the school had a Kindergarten classroom, a combined classroom for first and second grade students, and another combined classroom for grades three and four. Students receive general instruction in the elementary building, but in some cases travel to the main campus for classes such as music, art, and physical education.

== Craftsbury Academy ==
The term "Craftsbury Academy" refers to the main campus of the Craftsbury School System, which today serves a separate middle school and high school. The term also can refer to just the main building on the campus, or to the high school grade cluster.

Craftsbury Middle School serves grades five through eight, although in many cases grades five and six serves as a separate unit from grades seven and eight. The middle school is primarily housed in Minden Hall.

Craftsbury High School (often referred to as "Craftsbury Academy") serves grades nine through twelve, and is primarily housed in the upstairs of the old academy building. The high school has deep historic roots in the town, being created in the 1820s. There were eleven graduates in 2007, the typical size of a graduating class.

== Campus facilities ==
The local school system maintains an elementary school in the village, but the bulk of the buildings making up the campus are clustered on the east side of Craftsbury Common.

The academy building is the oldest structure, having been built in 1868 and expanded since (replacing an older brick academy nearby which had been destroyed by fire). In the 2010 to 2011 school year the academy building was extensively remodeled to bring it up to modern building codes while maintaining historic qualities. The upstairs of the building now serves the high school, while the downstairs serves as office space, a kitchen, and a multipurpose cafeteria known as the "Common Room" due to its views of scenic Craftsbury Common. The renovations are partly meant to vastly improve energy efficiency on campus. As renovated the Academy will be the state's first operating "High Performance School" for energy efficiency.

To the rear of the academy building is the gymnasium, built shortly after the Second World War and dedicated as a war memorial. The gymnasium includes a built-in stage, under which is the music room. The gym is significantly undersized and has serious structural deficiencies. Following the renovation of the Academy Building there are plans to remove the gym and rebuild a new structure of appropriate size. The new gym would be rededicated as a war memorial.

On the opposite end of the gym is a chapel which was moved across the town to its present location, known now as "The Annex". The Annex will be fully remodeled as part of the renovations, and will ultimately contain offices, locker rooms, a weight room, a classroom, and the heating system for the campus. Prior to the 2010-2011 renovations each building had its own heat system. As renovated the entire main campus will use a wood pellet boiler with a propane boiler as backup.

Just north of this complex is Minden Hall, which was built on-site after part of the previous structure was moved onto a new foundation nearby on the common. Minden Hall was built in 1989 as an auxiliary to the Academy complex. Downstairs in Minden Hall is a library, computer lab, and three classrooms. Upstairs are science labs and support services.

A few buildings to the south is the Industrial Arts building, which hosts the art rooms in an older building and a wood shop in a spacious newer addition.

A few miles north of campus is the Academy Woodlot, a school-owned forest which is carefully managed by the high school forestry program.

== See also ==
- Craftsbury, Vermont
