= Orrin Wiley Locke =

American politician

Member of the Vermont Senate from the Orleans Vermont Senate District district
- In office 1923–1924

Personal details
- Born: 1859 Coventry, Vermont
- Died: January 1, 1951 (aged 91–92)
- Party: Republican

Orrin Wiley Locke (April 24, 1859 in Coventry, Vermont – January 1, 1951) was a Republican member of the Vermont State Senate, who represented the Orleans Vermont Senate District.

Orrin Locke was first elected to the Vermont State Senate in 1922.

== Biography ==
Locke was born in Coventry, Vermont on April 24, 1859.

== Public life ==
Locke was first elected to the Vermont House of Representatives in 1912.

He was elected to the Vermont Senate in 1922.
