= Craftsbury Common, Vermont =

- Village
- Location within Vermont
- Coordinates: 44°39′15″N 72°22′55″W
- Country: United States
- State: Vermont
- County: Orleans
- Elevation: 1,240 ft (380 m)
- Time zone: UTC-5 (Eastern (EST))
  - Summer (DST): UTC-4 (EDT)
- ZIP code: 05827
- Area code: 802
- GNIS feature ID: 1457042

Craftsbury Common is an unincorporated village in the town of Craftsbury, Orleans County, Vermont, United States. The community is 5.3 miles (8.5 km) south of the village of Albany. Craftsbury Common has a post office with ZIP code 05827.

In 2026 Jon Marcus of National Public Radio stated that the area is "so isolated there's no cell service and it's rare to see a passing car."

== Education ==
Craftsbury town is in the Orleans Southwest Supervisory Union school district.

It is the location of Sterling College, which closed in 2026.
