= Newport Center, Vermont =

Census-designated place in Vermont, United States

- Census-designated place
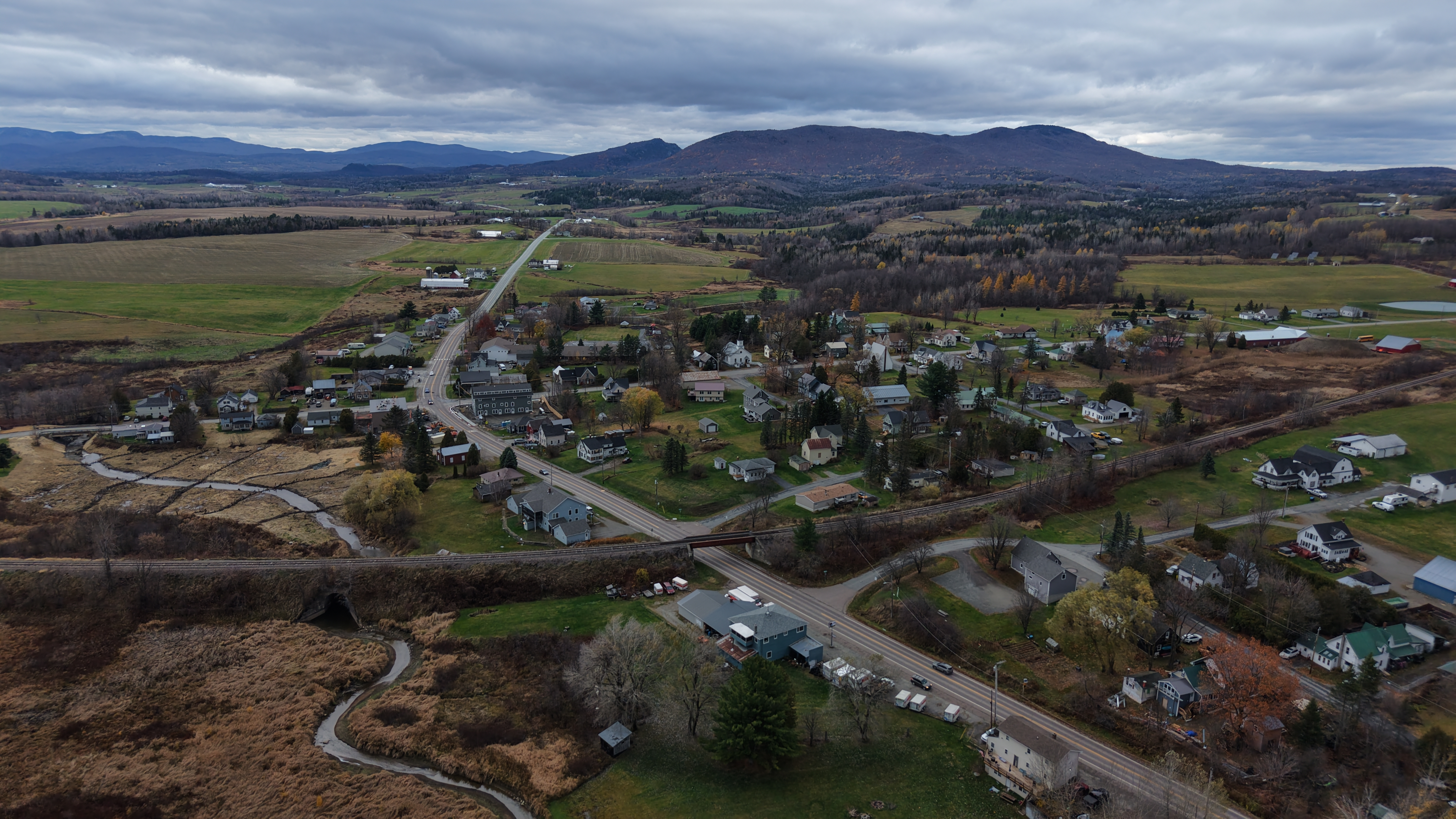
- Newport Center, VT, from the south

- Location within Vermont Location within the United States
- Coordinates: 44°57′10″N 72°18′23″W
- Country: United States
- State: Vermont
- County: Orleans
- Town: Newport

Area
  - Total: 0.40 sq mi (1.03 km^{2})
  - Land: 0.39 sq mi (1.02 km^{2})
  - Water: 0.0039 sq mi (0.01 km^{2})
- Elevation: 768 ft (234 m)

Population (2020)
  - Total: 231
- Time zone: UTC-5 (Eastern (EST))
  - Summer (DST): UTC-4 (EDT)
- ZIP Code: 05857
- Area code: 802
- FIPS code: 50-49000
- GNIS feature ID: 2586643

Newport Center is the primary village and a census-designated place (CDP) in the town of Newport, Orleans County, Vermont, United States. As of the 2020 census, it had a population of 231, out of 1,526 in the town of Newport.

== Geography ==
The CDP is in northern Orleans County, north of the geographic center of the town. It is in the valley of Mud Creek, a northwest-flowing tributary of the Missisquoi River, which flows west to Lake Champlain.

Vermont Route 105 passes through the village center, leading northwest 6 miles (10 km) to North Troy next to the Canadian border and east-southeast the same distance to the city of Newport on Lake Memphremagog.
