= Craftsbury Academy =

- Craftsbury, Vermont

Information
- Type: Secondary school
- Established: 1829; 197 years ago
- Principal: Lisa McCarthy
- Grades: 5-12
- Affiliation: Public
- Website: www.craftsbury.ossu.org

Craftsbury Academy is a term that is generally applied to the high school portion of the Craftsbury School System located in Craftsbury, Orleans County, Vermont, although occasionally it is extended to include the middle school as well, because it shares many resources with the high school.

The school has operated continuously since 1832, making it one of the oldest in the state. It faces Craftsbury Common. In the 21st century various building projects have upgraded the aging facilities, including a complete renovation of the old Academy Building, the annex (a relocated historic church converted into classroom space), and the World War II Memorial gymnasium. Once the renovations are complete the school board has stated that the campus will be up to modern building codes, and will be among the most energy efficient schools in New England.

== History ==
Craftsbury Academy was incorporated in October, 1829. The early school held classes in foreign languages, fine arts, and other liberal arts. The founders intended to support the school with the lease or development of 2,600 acres (11 km^{2}) on land belonging to the school, a typical hope of the time.

The first building was erected in 1832, a two-story brick structure. This structure became unsound and was replaced by a wood structure in 1868. This building, together with most of the school furniture, was destroyed by fire in 1879. With the insurance money and the subscriptions of the townspeople a new building was erected, designed to accommodate about eighty pupils.

A campus structure, Minden Hall, preserves the original name of the town. This building contains the middle school portion of the Craftsbury School System, although many resources are shared with other grade levels. Minden Hall was built in 1988 and has been lightly renovated as part of the much more intensive renovations being done on the older structures on campus.

== Academics ==
Craftsbury Schools offers a K-12 education program. The high school program includes instruction in science, social studies, mathematics, and English comparable to neighboring schools, and also offers a range of electives including arts, physical education, and Spanish. In 2012, Craftsbury Academy began a partnership with The Virtual High School, which allows students access to a range of online elective courses.

In September classes hike local mountains. In January and February students participate in the Physical Education program, which gives students various options for off-campus physical education opportunities, including ice skating, downhill and cross country skiing, and broom ball. In May and June students participate in Thematics, a hands-on learning program that explores sustainability related themes, such as watersheds and open spaces. Thematics activities include day trips and occasionally overnight experiences. These activities are complemented by school traditions such as Autumnfest, Winter Carnival, and Memorial Day celebrations.

Craftsbury Schools typically scores near the state average on standardized testing.

A seventh grader won the state spelling bee in 2010 and advanced to the national competition.
