= Albany (village), Vermont =

Albany, Vermont
- Village
- Location within the state of Vermont Albany (the United States)
- Coordinates: 44°43′53″N 72°22′38″W
- Country: United States
- State: Vermont
- County: Orleans
- Town: Albany

Area
  - Total: 1.55 sq mi (4.02 km^{2})
  - Land: 1.54 sq mi (3.99 km^{2})
  - Water: 0.012 sq mi (0.03 km^{2})
- Elevation: 945 ft (288 m)

Population (2020)
  - Total: 166
  - Density: 108/sq mi (41.6/km^{2})
- Time zone: UTC-5 (Eastern (EST))
  - Summer (DST): UTC-4 (EDT)
- ZIP code: 05820
- Area code: 802
- FIPS code: 50-00400
- GNIS feature ID: 2378297

Albany is a village in the town of Albany in Orleans County, Vermont, United States. The population was 166 at the 2020 census.

== Geography ==
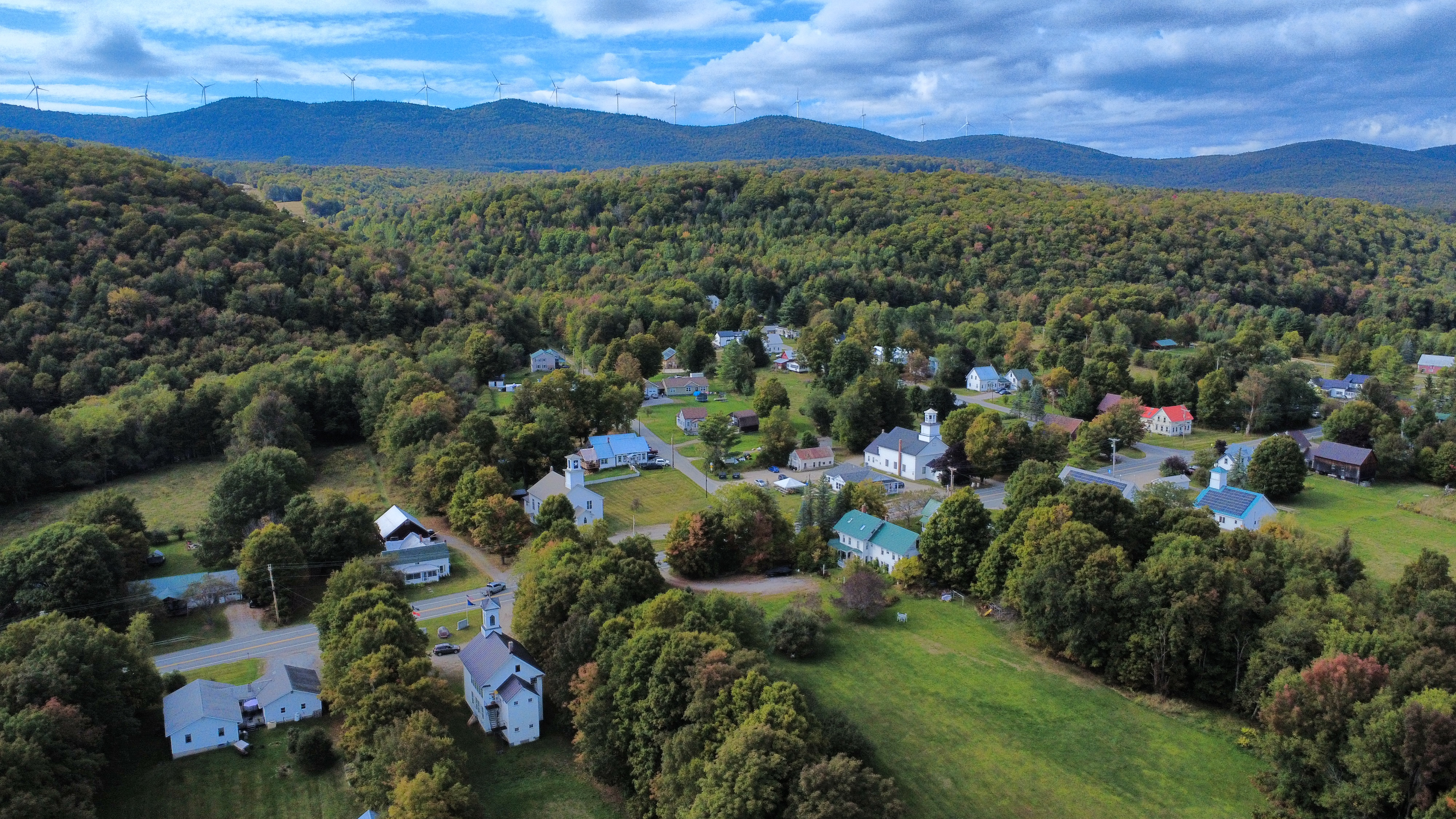
Albany, Vermont

According to the United States Census Bureau, the village has a total area of 1.5 square miles (4.0 km^{2}), all land.

== Demographics ==
Historical population
Census	Pop.	Note	%±
1920	152		—
1930	189		24.3%
1940	200		5.8%
1950	196		−2.0%
1960	169		−13.8%
1970	175		3.6%
1980	174		−0.6%
1990	180		3.4%
2000	165		−8.3%
2010	193		17.0%
2020	166		−14.0%
U.S. Decennial Census

As of the census of 2000, there were 165 people, 70 households, and 48 families residing in the village. The population density was 107.4 people per square mile (41.4/km^{2}). There were 79 housing units at an average density of 51.4/sq mi (19.8/km^{2}). The racial makeup of the village was 96.36% White, 1.21% Black or African American, and 2.42% from two or more races.

There were 70 households, out of which 30.0% had children under the age of 18 living with them, 57.1% were married couples living together, 7.1% had a female householder with no husband present, and 31.4% were non-families. 30.0% of all households were made up of individuals, and 14.3% had someone living alone who was 65 years of age or older. The average household size was 2.36 and the average family size was 2.83.

In the village, the population was spread out, with 22.4% under the age of 18, 9.1% from 18 to 24, 23.6% from 25 to 44, 31.5% from 45 to 64, and 13.3% who were 65 years of age or older. The median age was 39 years. For every 100 females, there were 87.5 males. For every 100 females age 18 and over, there were 88.2 males.

The median income for a household in the village was $27,750, and the median income for a family was $31,250. Males had a median income of $30,833 versus $19,107 for females. The per capita income for the village was $14,453. About 16.7% of families and 13.7% of the population were below the poverty line, including 13.6% of those under the age of eighteen and 41.7% of those sixty five or over.
