= Newport (town), Vermont =

Newport, Vermont
- Town
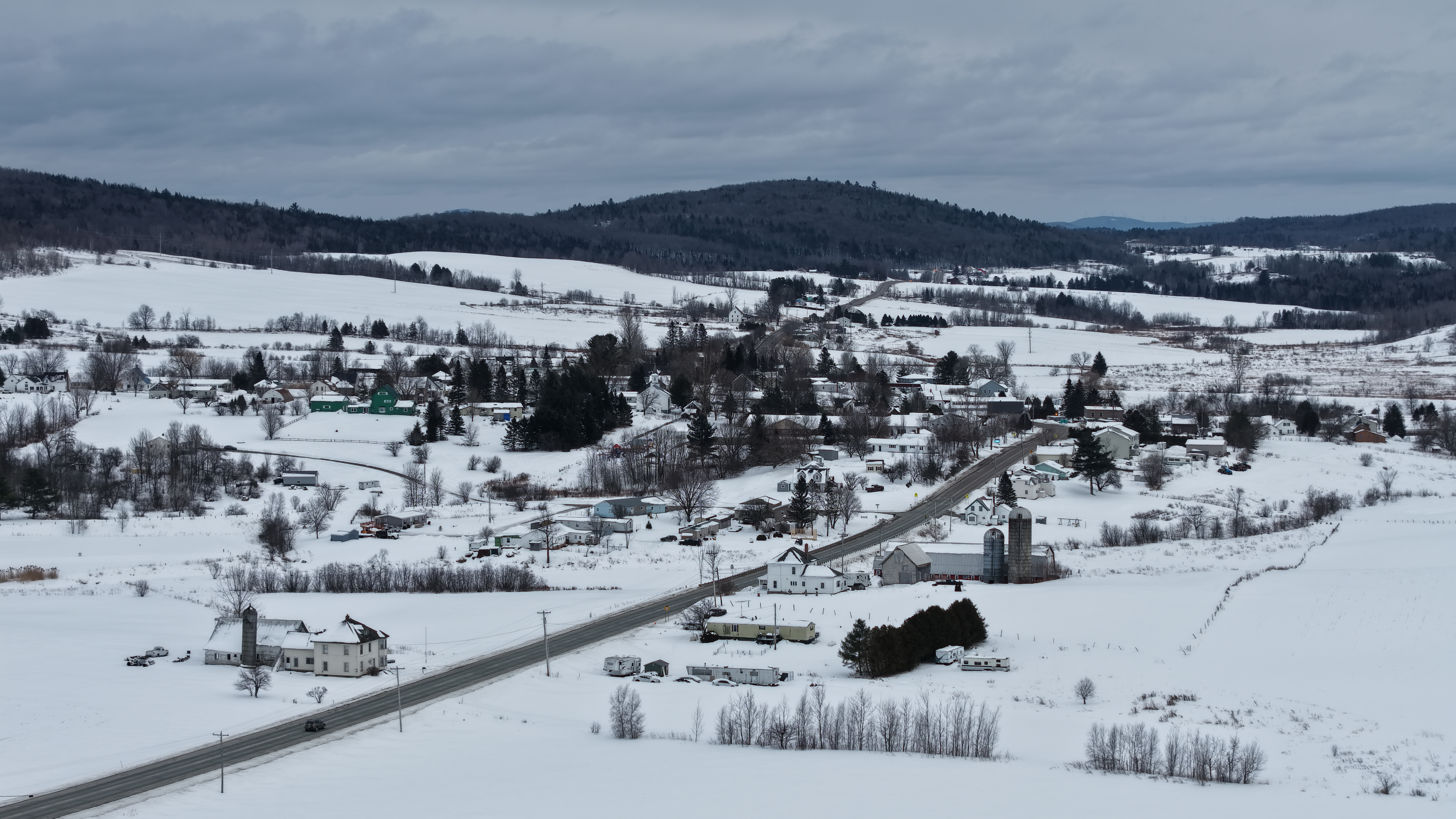
- Newport Center, Vermont, from the northwest

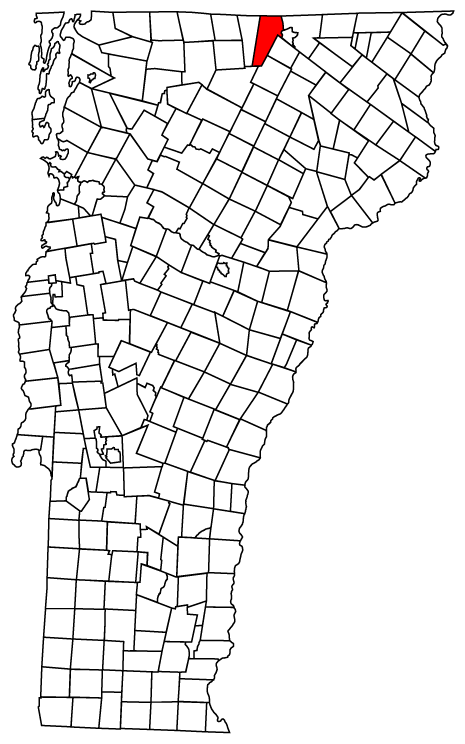
- Located in Orleans County, Vermont
- Coordinates: 44°56′39″N 72°18′2″W
- Country: United States
- State: Vermont
- County: Orleans
- Chartered: October 30, 1802
- Communities: Newport Center; South Newport

Area
  - Total: 43.5 sq mi (112.6 km^{2})
  - Land: 41.7 sq mi (108.0 km^{2})
  - Water: 1.8 sq mi (4.6 km^{2})
- Elevation: 919 ft (280 m)

Population (2000)
  - Total: 1,511
  - Density: 36/sq mi (14/km^{2})
- Time zone: UTC-5 (EST)
  - Summer (DST): UTC-4 (EDT)
- ZIP Codes: 05857 (Newport Center); 05855 (Newport city)
- Area code: 802
- FIPS code: 50-48925
- GNIS feature ID: 1462162
- Website: townofnewport.org

Newport is a town in Orleans County, Vermont, United States. The population was 1,526 at the 2020 census. The town is referred to by the United States Postal Service and the media as Newport Center, the name of the main settlement of the town. Newport is also the name of the neighboring city of Newport.

== History ==
Newport was formed on October 26, 1781, and chartered under the name of Duncansboro, to George Duncan, Nathan Fisk, and 63 others on October 30, 1802. Amos Sawyer, Enos Bartlett, James C. Adams were the first town selectman. Amos Sawyer was also the first Town Clerk. These were among the first settlers of Duncansboro. The name was altered from Duncansboro to Newport on October 30, 1816.

The first clearing, which began where Newport Center is now, was made by H. & A. Adams and D. & S. Meacham. Here they constructed a dam and put up a waterwheel sawmill on Mud Creek. Amos Sawyer, a carpenter by trade, built a home nearby. Two other settlements were established in the town: South Newport and Pickeral Point, later renamed Lake Bridge (named for its location at the head of Lake Memphremagog). By the late 19th century, the Boston and Maine and Central Vermont railroads were routed through Lake Bridge and the small village experienced a population boom. In 1868, the Lake Bridge settlement was incorporated as the "Village of Newport". The main town village, Newport Center, was also incorporated in 1908.

In 1917, the Village of Newport separated from the Town of Newport and merged with the Village of West Derby (in the town of Derby) to form the City of Newport. In 1931, by special acts of the General Assembly, the Village of Newport Center consolidated with the Town of Newport, with its former responsibilities automatically assumed by the town.

== Geography ==
According to the United States Census Bureau, the town has a total area of 43.5 square miles (112.6 km^{2}), of which 41.7 square miles (108.0 km^{2}) is land and 1.8 square miles (4.6 km^{2}) (4.07%) is water.

The unincorporated village of Newport Center is located roughly in the geographic center of town. The town also contains a smaller, secondary settlement, South Newport, located in the southern part of town.

== Demographics ==
Historical population
| Census | Pop. | Note | %± |
|---|---|---|---|
| 1800 | 50 | | — |
| 1810 | 28 | | −44.0% |
| 1820 | 52 | | 85.7% |
| 1830 | 284 | | 446.2% |
| 1840 | 591 | | 108.1% |
| 1850 | 748 | | 26.6% |
| 1860 | 1,197 | | 60.0% |
| 1870 | 2,050 | | 71.3% |
| 1880 | 2,426 | | 18.3% |
| 1890 | 3,047 | | 25.6% |
| 1900 | 1,239 | | −59.3% |
| 1910 | 1,236 | | −0.2% |
| 1920 | 1,187 | | −4.0% |
| 1930 | 1,193 | | 0.5% |
| 1940 | 1,064 | | −10.8% |
| 1950 | 966 | | −9.2% |
| 1960 | 1,010 | | 4.6% |
| 1970 | 1,125 | | 11.4% |
| 1980 | 1,319 | | 17.2% |
| 1990 | 1,367 | | 3.6% |
| 2000 | 1,511 | | 10.5% |
| 2010 | 1,594 | | 5.5% |
| 2020 | 1,526 | | −4.3% |
U.S. Decennial Census

As of the census of 2000, there were 1,511 people, 587 households, and 436 families residing in the town. The population density was 36.2 people per square mile (14.0/km^{2}). There were 746 housing units at an average density of 17.9/sq mi (6.9/km^{2}). The racial makeup of the town was 97.35% White, 0.26% Black or African American, 0.73% Native American, 0.26% Asian, 0.07% Pacific Islander, and 1.32% from two or more races. Hispanic or Latino of any race were 0.53% of the population.

There were 587 households, out of which 33.0% had children under the age of 18 living with them, 62.0% were married couples living together, 7.8% had a female householder with no husband present, and 25.6% were non-families. 19.1% of all households were made up of individuals, and 5.5% had someone living alone who was 65 years of age or older. The average household size was 2.57 and the average family size was 2.93.

In the town, the population was spread out, with 26.5% under the age of 18, 5.8% from 18 to 24, 28.5% from 25 to 44, 27.8% from 45 to 64, and 11.4% who were 65 years of age or older. The median age was 39 years. For every 100 females, there were 103.1 males. For every 100 females age 18 and over, there were 102.4 males.

The median income for a household in the town was $34,758, and the median income for a family was $43,828. Males had a median income of $28,063 versus $21,389 for females. The per capita income for the town was $17,677. About 10.1% of families and 12.7% of the population were below the poverty line, including 19.1% of those under age 18 and 4.1% of those age 65 or over.

The US Census Bureau estimates that the town's population increased 19.1% between 2000 and 2005, the second largest percentage increase in the state of Vermont.

== Government ==
=== Town ===
- Selectman – Steve Barrup
- Selectman – Richard Gosselin
- Selectman – Gerry Waterman
- Town Clerk – Denise Daigle
- Road Commissioner – Fred Baraw
- Zoning Administrator – Doug Lay
- Member, Planning Commission – Dan Boone

=== School District ===
- Member, School Board (2007–2009) – Kristin Grenier
- Member, School Board (2007–2010) – Wilma Therrien
- Member, School Board – Conrad Bellavance
- Budget – $2,400,000

== Notable people ==
- Charles Adams, first owner of the Boston Bruins, First National Stores, the Boston Braves, and Suffolk Downs
- Josiah Grout, 46th governor of Vermont; represented Newport in the legislature 1872–1876
- George "Spike" Hamilton, bandleader.
- Glenn D. Lowry, director of MoMA; summer

== See also ==
- Lake Memphremagog
- Newport (city), Vermont
