= Irasburg, Vermont =

- Town
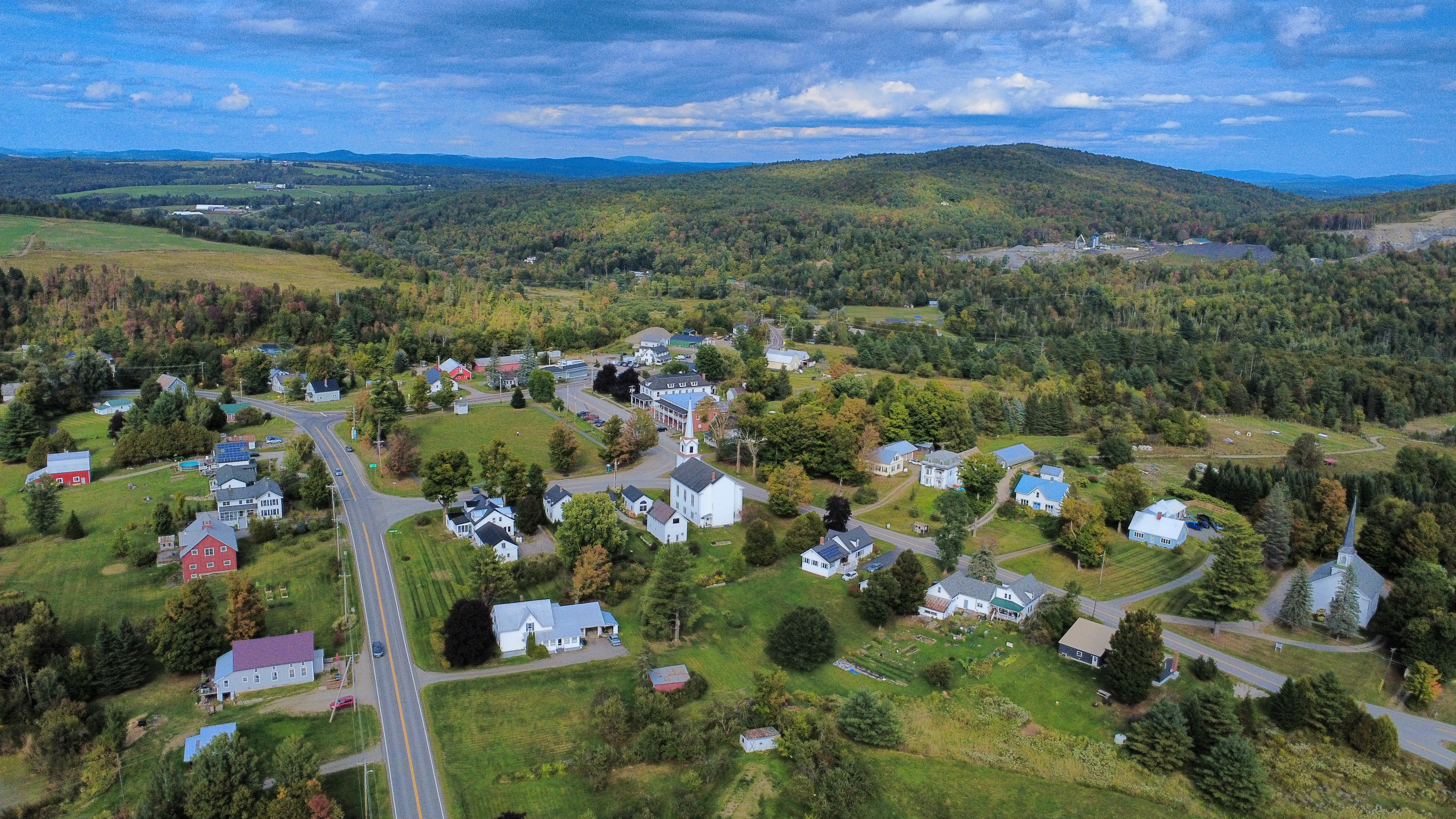
- Irasburg, VT, from the southwest

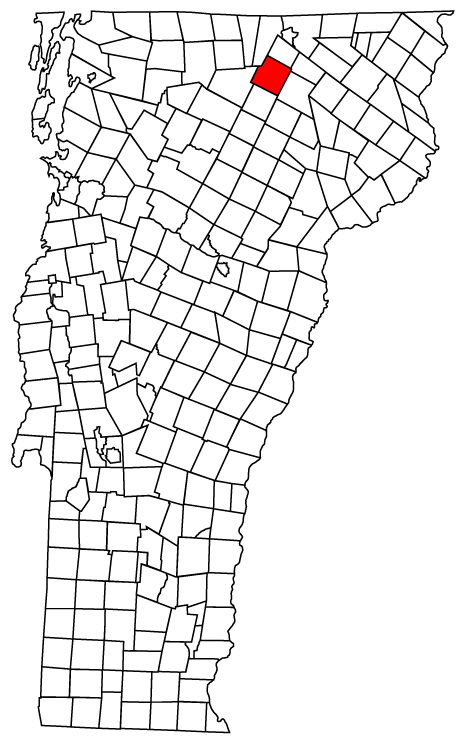
- Located in Orleans County, Vermont
- Coordinates: 44°50′24″N 72°16′34″W
- Country: United States
- State: Vermont
- County: Orleans
- Chartered: February 23, 1781
- Communities: Irasburg

Area
  - Total: 40.6 sq mi (105.1 km^{2})
  - Land: 40.5 sq mi (105.0 km^{2})
  - Water: 0.077 sq mi (0.2 km^{2})
- Elevation: 1,001 ft (305 m)

Population (2020)
  - Total: 1,233
  - Density: 30/sq mi (11.7/km^{2})
- Time zone: UTC-5 (EST)
  - Summer (DST): UTC-4 (EDT)
- ZIP Codes: 05845 (Irasburg); 05860 (Orleans); 05822 (Barton)
- Area code: 802
- FIPS code: 50-35575
- GNIS feature ID: 1462124

Irasburg is a town in Orleans County, Vermont, United States. Irasburg was established in 1781 when the land was granted to Ira Allen, Roger Enos, Jerusha Enos (wife of Roger Enos), Jerusha Enos, Jr. (wife of Ira Allen), Roger Enos, Jr. and others by the Vermont General Assembly. Ira Allen later obtained the rights of the other proprietors, and he deeded the town to Jerusha Enos, Jr. as a wedding gift.

The 2020 United States Census reported that there were 1,233 citizens living in Irasburg. Irasburg has a total land area of 40.6 square miles (105 km^{2}), 40.5 square miles (105 km^{2}) being land and .1 square miles (0.26 km^{2}) being water. The unincorporated village of Irasburg is in the center of the town.

On average, it snows 9 out of the 12 months of the year.

== History ==
The land now known as Irasburg was granted on February 23, 1781, to Ira Allen, by the General Assembly of Vermont. The lands of Vermont were then claimed by both New Hampshire and New York. The Continental Congress ordered that the land would not be distributed until the inhabitants of New York, New Hampshire, and the land known as "Vermont" had resolved the conflict of who truly owned the land. The General assembly of Vermont ignored this order, however, and Vermont was granted to 40–70 individuals. Ira Allen, the person known to have been granted the most land, was born in Colchester in 1790 and attended Middlebury College and the University of Vermont. The Allens leased the land that they had received to settlers. Although Ira Allen was the first to be granted land, Irasburg's first settler was Caleb Leach in 1798. No land was conveyed by deed, however, until Ira H. Allen, son of Ira Allen, became town resident in 1814 and served as town clerk.

Captain James Richardson settled Irasburg in 1803 and is believed to have opened the first tavern in town.

The production of salts and pearl-ashes was the primary industry in Irasburg for the early 19th century. Although there was an embargo, those goods were transported to Canada. There was a large amount of smuggling of the salts and pearl-ashes by the town's residents.

Mills emerged in Irasburg as early as 1810. By the 1820s, the town had begun to prosper as industrial sites began to emerge, which included a woolen mill, tannery, and factory production of stoves and plows.

The Old Heerman Mill was located here.

In 1812, the legislature voted to change the shire town of Orleans County to Irasburg. Supporting buildings were completed in 1816.

In 1812, Irasburg became an Orleans County shire town, as it remained until 1886. In 1886, the legislature moved the shire town to Newport.

The first courthouse and jail were built in 1815, by Irasburg residents at their own expense. The original courthouse was moved in 1847, however, and a new one was built on the same site. The original jail was built of timber and was replaced by one that was made of stone in 1838. It was eventually made of granite in 1862. In 1862, Company E of the 9th Vermont Infantry was recruited, in part, from Irasburg.

In 1877, the town was still spelled "Irasburgh."

The original county courthouse burned, with all of its records, in 1910 or 1911. A new Irasburg Town Hall was built in 1911 and remodeled in 1990.

The town was in the national news in 2010 when it appeared that a moose was going to be destroyed for theoretically carrying disease but mostly because "tamed" wildlife is not allowed in Vermont. The Vermont Legislature crafted a law that spared the moose's life.

== Geography ==
According to the United States Census Bureau, the town has a total area of 40.6 square miles (105.1 km^{2}), of which 40.5 square miles (105.0 km^{2}) is land and 0.1 square mile (0.2 km^{2}) (0.15%) is water.

The Black River flows through the town in a northerly direction, receiving a number of small streams. It enters east of Potters Pond. It continues northeast, then east to the village of Irasburg. Just upstream of the village, Lords Creek enters. This creek is about 10 miles (16 km) long and drains a watershed that is 17 square miles (44 km^{2}). Downstream of Irasburg, the Black River continues north. It then flows into the town of Coventry.

The Barton River, after leaving Orleans, flows through eastern Irasburg, and enters Coventry.

=== Climate ===
Record temperatures have never exceeded 98 °F (37 °C). July, the hottest month, has averaged just over 80 °F (27 °C). The record low occurred in December where temperatures reached −40 °F (−40 °C). On average it snows 9 out of the 12 months of the year. The majority of the snowfall occurs between the months of November and March. Each of these months average over 10 inches (250 mm). Irasburg averages about 103 inches (2,600 mm) of snow annually.

Climate data for Newport, Vermont
| Month | Jan | Feb | Mar | Apr | May | Jun | Jul | Aug | Sep | Oct | Nov | Dec | Year |
|---|---|---|---|---|---|---|---|---|---|---|---|---|---|
| Record high °F (°C) | 64 (18) | 62 (17) | 83 (28) | 87 (31) | 92 (33) | 95 (35) | 98 (37) | 95 (35) | 96 (36) | 84 (29) | 74 (23) | 66 (19) | 98 (37) |
| Mean daily maximum °F (°C) | 26.3 (−3.2) | 31.0 (−0.6) | 41.0 (5.0) | 54.2 (12.3) | 69.0 (20.6) | 76.8 (24.9) | 80.9 (27.2) | 78.8 (26.0) | 69.5 (20.8) | 57.0 (13.9) | 43.1 (6.2) | 31.0 (−0.6) | 54.9 (12.7) |
| Mean daily minimum °F (°C) | 5.5 (−14.7) | 7.8 (−13.4) | 18.7 (−7.4) | 31.3 (−0.4) | 43.2 (6.2) | 52.4 (11.3) | 56.8 (13.8) | 54.8 (12.7) | 46.8 (8.2) | 37.0 (2.8) | 27.3 (−2.6) | 13.0 (−10.6) | 32.9 (0.5) |
| Record low °F (°C) | −38 (−39) | −38 (−39) | −32 (−36) | −2 (−19) | 20 (−7) | 28 (−2) | 36 (2) | 32 (0) | 20 (−7) | 0 (−18) | −7 (−22) | −40 (−40) | −40 (−40) |
| Average precipitation inches (mm) | 2.96 (75) | 2.16 (55) | 2.96 (75) | 2.93 (74) | 3.67 (93) | 3.93 (100) | 4.19 (106) | 4.18 (106) | 3.76 (96) | 3.45 (88) | 3.47 (88) | 3.12 (79) | 40.78 (1,035) |
| Average snowfall inches (cm) | 24.7 (63) | 17.2 (44) | 18.8 (48) | 6.9 (18) | 0.1 (0.25) | 0 (0) | 0 (0) | 0 (0) | 01 (2.5) | 1.1 (2.8) | 11.0 (28) | 23.1 (59) | 102.9 (261) |
Source: NOAA

== Demographics ==
Historical population
| Census | Pop. | Note | %± |
|---|---|---|---|
| 1800 | 15 | | — |
| 1810 | 292 | | 1,846.7% |
| 1820 | 432 | | 47.9% |
| 1830 | 860 | | 99.1% |
| 1840 | 971 | | 12.9% |
| 1850 | 1,034 | | 6.5% |
| 1860 | 1,131 | | 9.4% |
| 1870 | 1,085 | | −4.1% |
| 1880 | 1,064 | | −1.9% |
| 1890 | 999 | | −6.1% |
| 1900 | 939 | | −6.0% |
| 1910 | 983 | | 4.7% |
| 1920 | 999 | | 1.6% |
| 1930 | 924 | | −7.5% |
| 1940 | 852 | | −7.8% |
| 1950 | 711 | | −16.5% |
| 1960 | 711 | | 0.0% |
| 1970 | 775 | | 9.0% |
| 1980 | 870 | | 12.3% |
| 1990 | 907 | | 4.3% |
| 2000 | 1,077 | | 18.7% |
| 2010 | 1,163 | | 8.0% |
| 2020 | 1,233 | | 6.0% |
U.S. Decennial Census

As of the census of 2010, there were 1,096 people, 452 households, and 318 families residing in Irasburg. There were 545 housing units. The racial makeup of the town was 96.6% White, 1059 people, .5% black, 5 people, .1% Native American, 1 person, 0.5% Asian, 5 people, 0.5% from other races, 6 people, and 1.8% from two or more races, 20 people. Hispanic or Latino people of any race were 1.1% of the population, 12 people.

There were 452 households, out of which 27.9%, 127 households, had children under the age of 18 living with them, 56.4% were married couples living together, 255 households, 9.5% had a female householder with no husband present, 43 people, 4.4% were males with no family, 20 people, and 21.7% were non-families. 22.6% of all households were made up of individuals, 102, and 4.4%, 20 houses had someone living alone who was 65 years of age or older. The average household size was 2.42 and the average family size was 2.81.

The ages of people were found as follows. 54 people, or 4.9% of the population were from 5 to 9 years old. 74, or 6.8% were from 10 to 14 years. 70, or 6.4% were from 15 to 19 years old. 76, or 6.9% were from 20 to 24 years old. 49, or 4.5% were from 25 to 29 years old. 63 or 5.7% were from 30 to 34 years old. 62, or 5.7% were from 35 to 39 years old. 59, or 5.4% were from 40 to 44 years old. 71, or 6.5% were from 45 to 49 years old. 105, or 9.6% were from 50 to 54 years. 89, or 8.1% were from 55 to 59 years old. 86, or 7.8% were from 60 to 64 years old. 63, or 5.7%, were from 65 to 69 years old. 64, or 5.8% were from 70 to 74 years old. 45, or 4.1% were from 75 to 79 years old. 27, or 2.5%, were from 80 to 84 years old. 18, or 1.6% were 85 years and over.

At the time of the 2010 census, there were 574 males and 522 females living in Irasburg. The median age for males was 42, and the median age for females was 44.4.

== Government ==
=== School district ===
- Budget – $1,803,259 plus assessment for Lake Region Union High School
- Number of students – 130
- Special Needs students – 20%
- Per student – "over $16,000"

There is only one elementary school (Irasburg Village School). The school consists of students in K through 8th grade, consisting of a total of 130 students.

The school provides three seasons of intramural sports. It is located Irasburg village.

Irasburg Village School is part of the Orleans Central Supervisory Union. 9th through 12th grade students attend the Lake Region Union High School.

== Cultural events ==
The Kingdom run annual foot race takes place each summer. The racecourse is a loop that starts and finishes in the Irasburg town commons. Runners may race 5 kilometres (3.1 mi), 10 kilometres (6.2 mi) or 20 kilometres (12 mi).

The annual Irasburg Church Fair started 1952. The fair includes an auction and the sale of baked goods.

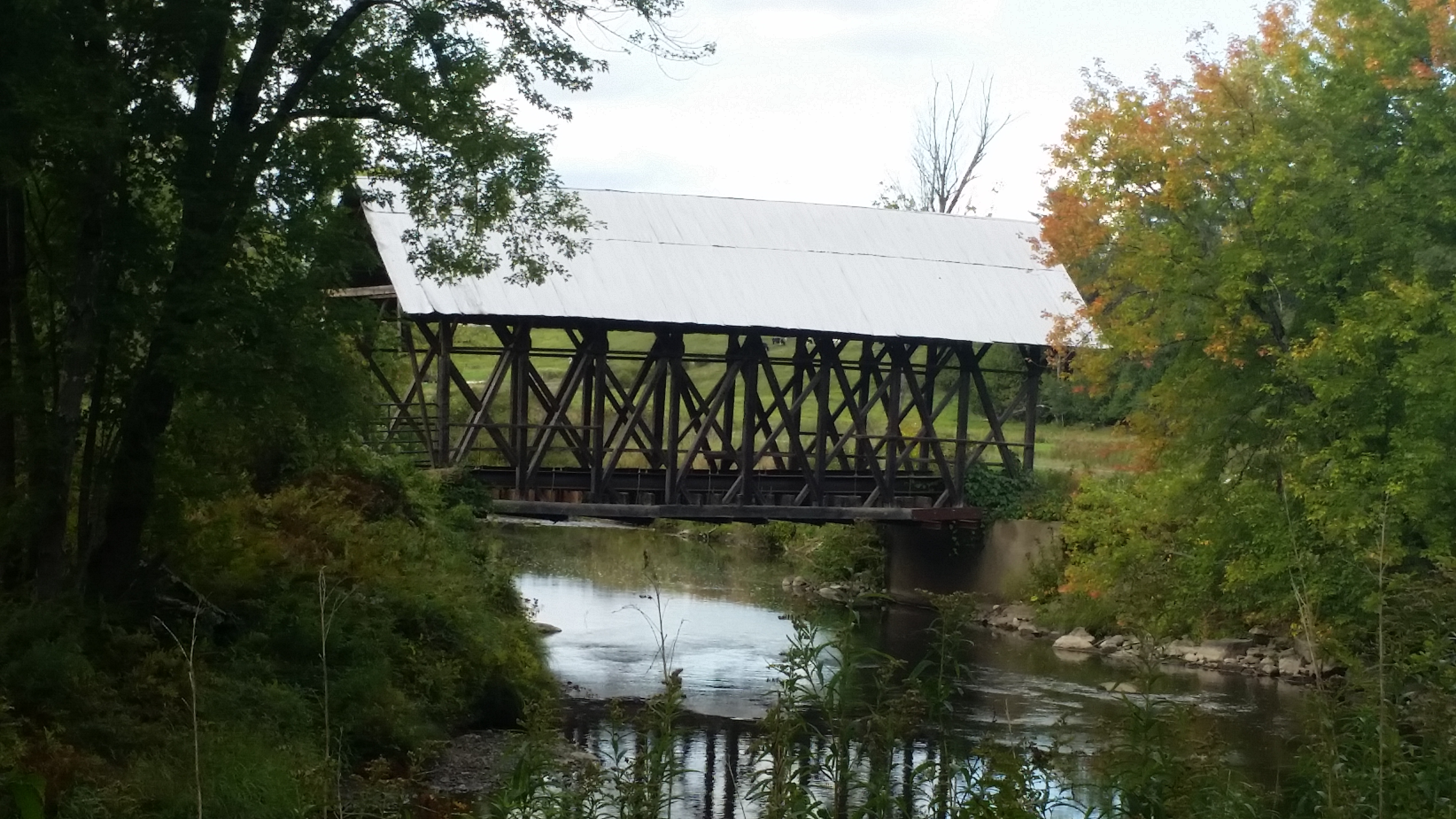
Lord's Creek Covered Bridge in Irasburg

== Landmarks ==
There was a round barn on Vermont Route 58 about 1.5 miles (2.4 km) west of the village of Irasburg. On August 23, 2016, this historic barn was destroyed by a fire. The Lord's Creek Covered Bridge was built in 1881. It is located on Covered Bridge Road.

== Notable people ==
- Elias P. Bailey (1832–1881), member of the Wisconsin State Assembly
- Henry M. Bates (1808–1865), politician, Vermont State Treasurer
- Elinor Langton-Boyle (1865–1946) businesswoman, and journalist in Hawaii
- Howard Frank Mosher (1942–2017), author
- Theodore Robinson (1852–1896), impressionist landscape painter
- Frank D. Thompson (1876–1940), judge, associate justice of the Vermont Supreme Court
- Laforrest H. Thompson (1848–1900), judge, president of the Vermont State Senate, Justice of the Vermont Supreme Court
