= Brownington Branch =

Location
- Country: United States
- State: Vermont
- County: Orleans County, Vermont

Physical characteristics
- Source
  - location: Mountain brook, Westmore, Vermont, Orleans County, Vermont, Vermont, US
  - coordinates: 44°48′36″N 72°02′27″W
  - elevation: 446 meters (1,463 ft)
- Mouth
  - location: Willoughby River (Vermont), Brownington, Vermont, Orleans County, Vermont, Vermont, US
  - coordinates: 44°49′01″N 72°09′08″W
  - elevation: 302 meters (991 ft)
- Length: 12.7 km (7.9 mi)

Basin features
- Tributaries
  - right: (from the mouth) Bassett Brook, Moody Brook.

The Brownington Branch is a tributary of the Willoughby River, flowing in Orleans County, Vermont, in northern Vermont, in United States.

This river flows northwest, then to the west, crossing the municipality of Westmore and Brownington. Its course runs through forested areas, agricultural and urban.

== Course ==
Branch Brownington rises as a mountain stream on the north slope of Mount Goodwin which is located in the northeastern of Lake Willoughby. This source is located at:

- 0.6 km (0.37 mi) north-western boundary of the municipality of Westmore;
- 4.2 km (2.6 mi) north of Lake Willoughby;
- 7.7 km (4.8 mi) east of the confluence of the Branch Brownington;
- 8.2 km (5.1 mi) northeast of the top of Mount Barton.

From its source, Branch Brownington runs on 12.7 km (7.9 mi) according to the following segments:

- 3.2 km (2.0 mi) to the northwest in the municipality of Brownington, Vermont including 0.7 km (0.43 mi) along the boundary between the municipalities of Brownington and Charleston until Moody Creek (from the north);
- 3.2 km (2.0 mi) to the southwest in the municipality of Brownington, Vermont until a road;
- 0.6 km (0.37 mi) to the Southwest until Bassett Creek (from the north);
- 5.7 km (3.5 mi) to the Southwest meandering in a valley along the contour of the surrounding mountains to its confluence.

The confluence of the Brownington Branch is located at:

- 3.6 km (2.2 mi) northeast of downtown Orleans;
- 6.8 km (4.2 mi) northwest of Lake Willoughby;
- 3.7 km (2.3 mi) east of the confluence of the Willoughby River.

Brownington Branch empties into a river bend on the north bank of the Willoughby River. The latter flows southwest, then northwest to the East bank of the Barton River. In turn, it flows north up to the south shore of Lake Memphremagog which discharges into the Magog River to Quebec. The latter is a tributary of the Saint Francis River in the city of Sherbrooke.

== Toponymy ==
The English place name "Brownington Branch" was made official on 29 October 1980 at the Geographic Names Information Systems (GNIS)

== See also ==
Media related to Category: Brownington Branch River at Wikimedia Commons

- Orleans County, Vermont
- Willoughby River
- Brownington, Vermont
- Charleston, Vermont
- List of rivers of Vermont
