= Willoughby River =

- Location of mouth within Vermont

Location
- Country: United States
- State: Vermont
- County: Orleans County

Physical characteristics
- Source: Lake Willoughby
  - location: Westmore, Vermont, Orleans County, Vermont, United States
  - coordinates: 44°44′53″N 72°03′34″W
  - elevation: 1,168 ft (356 m)
- Mouth: Barton River
  - location: Orleans, Vermont, Orleans County, Vermont, United States
  - coordinates: 44°49′03″N 72°12′14″W
  - elevation: 715 ft (218 m)
- Length: 11.6 mi (18.7 km)
- Discharge
  - location: Orlean, Vermont

Basin features
- Tributaries
  - left: Lord Brook
  - right: Brownington Branch

The Willoughby River (/ˈwɪləbi/ WIL-ə-bee) is a tributary of the Barton River, flowing on 18.6 km (11.6 mi), in the Orleans County, Vermont, United States.

This river flows to northwest, southwest and northwest, crossing the municipalities of Westmore, Vermont, Orleans and Brownington. Its course runs through forested areas, agricultural and urban.

== Course ==
The Willoughby River rises on the northwest shore of Lake Willoughby (length: 6.9 km (4.3 mi); maximum length: 1.3 km (0.81 mi); height: 356 meters (1,168 ft)). The southern part of the lake is surrounded by the Willoughby State Forest. This natural park contains the Mount Pisgah, Mount Hor and Mount Bartlett.

From the mouth of the Lake Willoughby, the Willoughby River flows on 18.6 km (11.6 mi) according to the following segments:

- 4.9 km (3.0 mi) to the northwest in the municipality of Westmore, Vermont until the Lord stream (from the South) which drains the "Stillwater Swamp" located at West of Lake Willoughby;
- 6.6 km (4.1 mi) to the northwest in the municipality of Brownington, Vermont until Brownington Branch (from the northeast);
- 4.0 km (2.5 mi) to the southwest, en traversant la limite de Orleans to the outlet of a lake (from the southeast);
- 3.1 km (1.9 mi) to the northwest in Orleans across a valley and a plain where the river marks the boundary from north of the village of Orleans, Vermont to its confluence.

== Toponymy ==
The term "Willoughby" is a surname of English origin.

The English place name "Willoughby River" was made official October 29, 1980 to the GNIS.

== See also ==
- Orleans County, Vermont
- List of rivers in Vermont
