= Lake Parker =

Lake Parker may refer to:

- Lake Parker (Florida), a lake in Lakeland, Florida
- Lake Parker, a lake west of Lake Wales, Florida
- Lake Parker (Vermont), a lake in Orleans County, Vermont
