= Crystal Lake (Vermont) =

Lake located in Orleans County, Vermont, USA

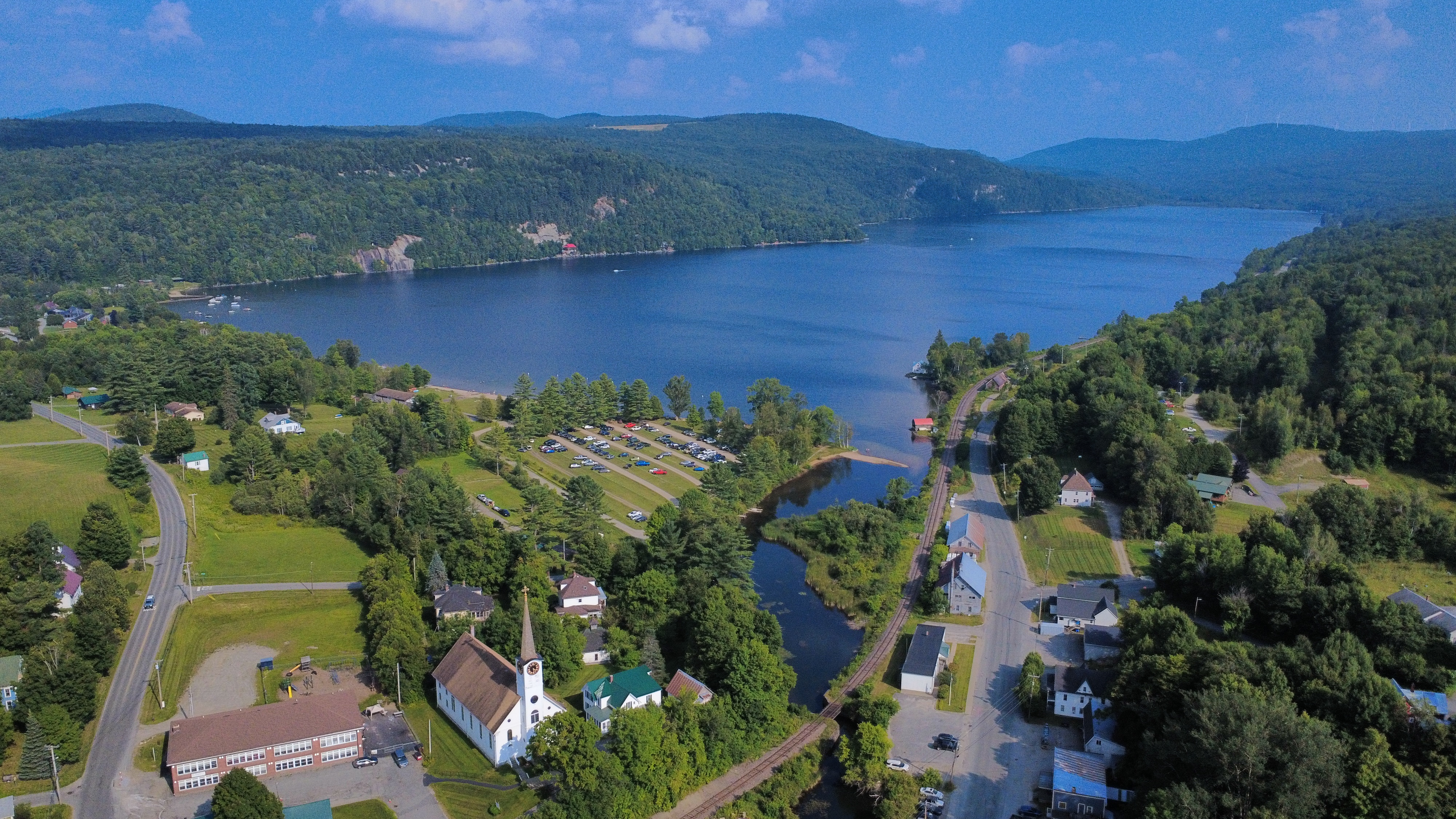
- View of Crystal Lake, VT, from the northwest

- Location within Vermont Location within the United States
- Location: Barton, Orleans County, Vermont, United States
- Coordinates: 44°43.92′N 72°9.06′W
- Basin countries: United States
- Max. length: 3 mi (4.8 km)
- Max. width: 1 mi (1.6 km)
- Surface area: 763 acres (3.09 km^{2})
- Max. depth: 100 ft (30 m)
- Surface elevation: 968 ft (295 m)

Crystal Lake is located near the village of Barton in Orleans County, Vermont, United States. It is a glacial lake 3 by 1 mile (4.8 by 1.6 km) and 100 feet (30 m) deep in places. Route 5 runs along the lake's western shore. Crystal Lake is in the northeastern section of the state of Vermont. The lake is owned by the state and managed by the Department of Environmental Conservation.

Exotic species infestations are a concern, with an existing Eurasian water milfoil population, which is being addressed.

The lake is a coldwater fishery. Lake trout are native and the current population is wild. There are rainbow trout (wild and stocked), yellow perch, smallmouth bass, rock bass, pumpkinseed, chain pickerel, longnose suckers, white suckers, and various minnow species.

== History ==
Rogers' Rangers were forced to retreat through the area following their attack on Saint-Francis, Quebec in 1759. The fleeing rangers split up before reaching Barton. One group followed the Barton River south to the falls at the outlet of Crystal Lake, where they were able to catch fish. From there, they continued south over the summit into the Passumpsic River Valley.

In the 19th century, the lake was sometimes called "Belle Pond."

Construction on a dam to enhance and control the lake was completed in 1860. It consists of concrete, stone, and masonry. The core is concrete. The foundation is rock, and soil. The height is 17 feet (5.2 m) by 65 feet (20 m) long. Maximum discharge is 1,700 cubic feet (48 m^{3}) per second. The capacity is 6,740 acre-feet (8,310,000 m^{3}). Normal storage is 2,808 acre-feet (3,464,000 m^{3}). It drains an area of 22.5828 square miles (58.489 km^{2}).

Circa 1900, a granite quarry was located on the east side of the lake. Steamboats barged stone across to the west side.

The lake has two parks at the northern end. The State Park was started by the CCC during the Depression, but not completed until the 1940s. It is at the northwestern edge. It was added to the National Register of Historic Places August 30, 2005.

Adjacent to the state park, at the northeastern end, is Pageant Park, the Barton, Vermont town park.

== See also ==
- Barton, Vermont
- Lake Willoughby
- Glacial Lake
