= Charles Jamieson =

Charles Jamieson may refer to:

- Charlie Jamieson (1893–1969), American baseball player
- Charles Jamieson (politician) (1888–1959), member of the Queensland Legislative Assembly
- Charles Clark Jamieson (1866–1935), United States Army general
