= Barton River (Vermont) =

River in Vermont

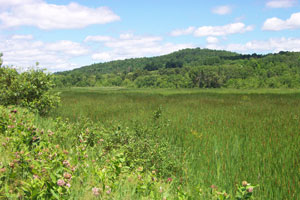
- Barton River Marsh

Location
- Country: United States
- State: Vermont
- Region: Northeast Kingdom
- City: Newport, Vermont

Physical characteristics
- Source: Crystal Lake
  - location: Orleans County, Vermont, United States
  - coordinates: 44°43′55″N 72°9′4″W
  - elevation: 968 ft (295 m)
- Mouth: Lake Memphremagog
  - location: Newport, Orleans County, Vermont, United States
  - coordinates: 44°56′39″N 72°12′16″W
  - elevation: 682 ft (208 m)
- Length: 22 mi (35 km)
- Basin size: 174 mi^{2} (450 km^{2})
- Discharge
  - location: Newport, Vermont

Basin features
- Tributaries
  - right: Crystal Lake, Willoughby River

The Barton River is a tributary of Lake Memphremagog, over 22 miles (35 km) long, in northern Vermont in the United States.

It runs north from Glover through Barton, Brownington, Coventry and drains through Newport into Lake Memphremagog's South Bay.

== Course ==
The Barton River arises from the fountains of the former Runaway Pond in Glover.

The stretch of river from Vermont Route 16 north of Glover village to Lake Memphremagog is 21.5 miles (34.6 km) long and is rated by American Whitewater as a class I-III section.

Roaring Brook runs from Parker Pond in West Glover to the river in southern Barton near Route 16.

One of the head branches is the drain from Crystal Lake in the village of Barton.

After leaving Barton village, U.S. Route 5, Interstate 91 and the railroad all follow the course of the Barton River valley north to Newport.

The Willoughby River flows from Lake Willoughby into the Barton River in Orleans and provides considerable volume. Orleans was once called "Barton Landing" and was the place where, historically, craft could be safely loaded for transport north.

After leaving Orleans, it flows through eastern Irasburg, through Coventry and then into Lake Memphremagog.

Parts of the following Vermont towns are in the Barton River watershed: Derby, Coventry, Brownington, Irasburg, Barton, Westmore, Sheffield, Glover, and Albany. Water bodies in the watershed include Lake Willoughby, Crystal Lake, Shadow Lake, Lake Parker, and Brownington Pond.

== See also ==
- List of rivers of Vermont
- List of rivers of the United States
