= Senator Bliss =

Senator Bliss may refer to:

- Aaron T. Bliss (1837–1906), Michigan State Senate
- George Bliss (Massachusetts politician) (1793–1873), Massachusetts State Senate
- Larry Bliss (born 1946), Maine State Senate
- Stephen Bliss (1787–1847), Virginia State Senate
