= Glover (CDP), Vermont =

Census-designated place in Vermont, United States

Glover, Vermont
- Census-designated place
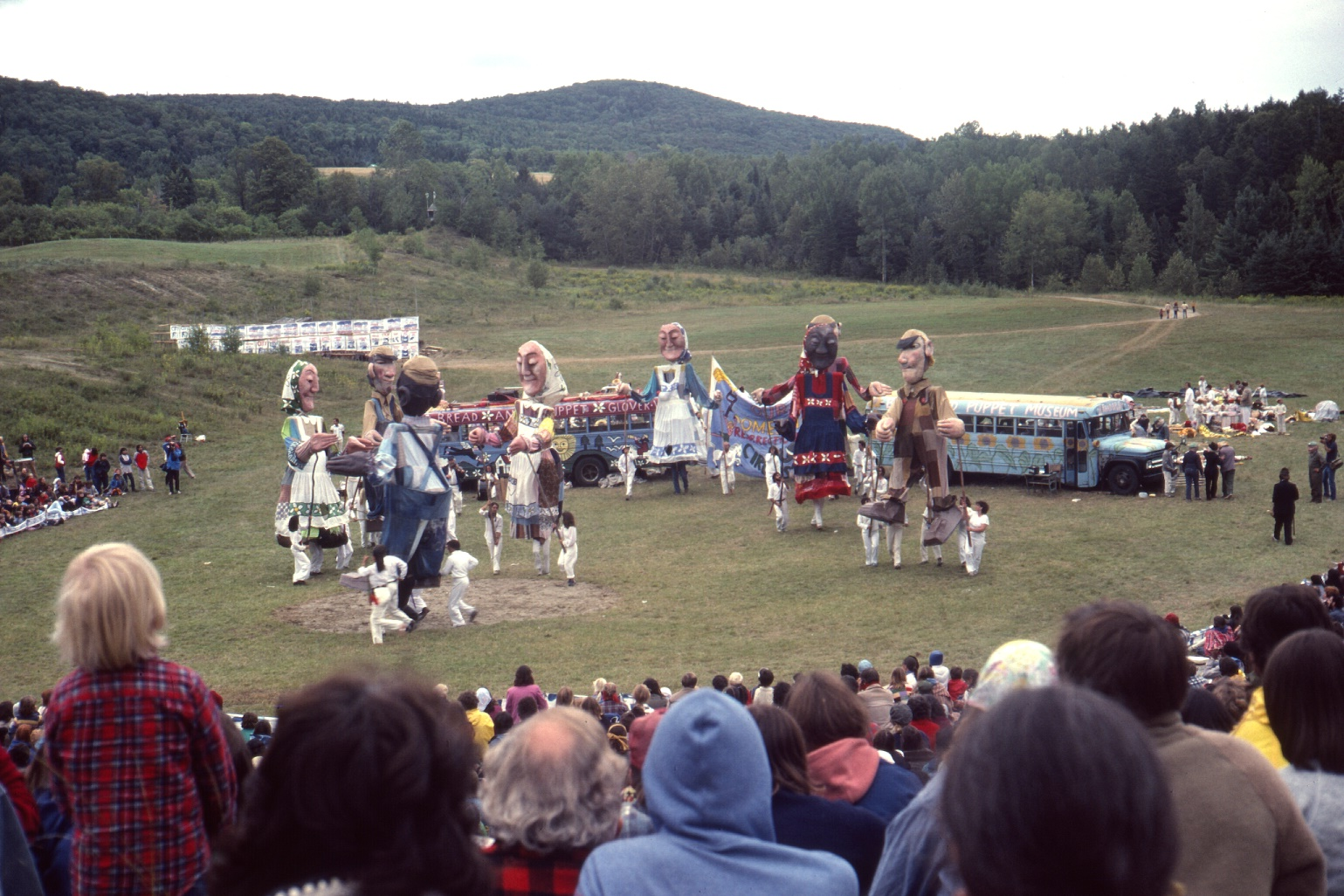
- The Bread and Puppet Theater's annual domestic resurrection circus in Glover Vermont

- Location within Vermont Location within the United States
- Coordinates: 44°42′28″N 72°11′36″W
- Country: United States
- State: Vermont
- County: Orleans
- Town: Glover

Area
  - Total: 1.75 sq mi (4.54 km^{2})
  - Land: 1.75 sq mi (4.53 km^{2})
  - Water: 0 sq mi (0.0 km^{2})
- Elevation: 1,070 ft (330 m)

Population (2020)
  - Total: 256
- Time zone: UTC-5 (Eastern (EST))
  - Summer (DST): UTC-4 (EDT)
- ZIP Code: 05839
- Area code: 802
- FIPS code: 50-28000
- GNIS feature ID: 2586632

Glover is the primary village and a census-designated place (CDP) in the town of Glover, Orleans County, Vermont, United States. As of the 2020 census, it had a population of 256, out of 1,114 in the entire town of Glover.

The CDP is in southeastern Orleans County, along the northern edge of the town of Glover. It is bordered to the north by the town of Barton. Vermont Route 16 runs through the community, leading north 3 miles (5 km) to Barton village and southwest 19 miles (31 km) to Hardwick.

The Barton River flows northward through the village; it is the southernmost tributary of Lake Memphremagog.
