= Orleans County Monitor =

The Orleans County Monitor was a weekly newspaper published in Barton, Vermont from January 8, 1872, to 1953. It was published by Ellery H. Webster in 1872. An American Civil War veteran, he named it after the USS Monitor. George H. Blake published the paper in 1877. The circulation was 1,400. Wallace Harry Gilpin owned the paper from 1904 to 1953.
