= Museum of Everyday Life =

Museum in Vermont

The Museum of Everyday Life
- Location within the United States
- Established: 2011
- Location: Glover, Vermont
- Coordinates: 44°38′28.28″N 72°12′20.31″W
- Founder: Clare Dolan
- Website: museumofeverydaylife.org

The Museum of Everyday Life was founded in 2011 by Clare Dolan in Glover, Vermont. It is an independently run museum whose mission is to capture a “...slow-motion cataloguing of the quotidian–a detailed, theatrical expression of gratitude and love for the minuscule and unglamorous experience of daily life in all its forms.” The museum's focus is to highlight the beauty in everyday objects that are traditionally overlooked or taken for granted and does so by creating public exhibits, writing articles and manifestos in their philosophy department, and by creating and doing live performances.

The museum, housed in a 70-year-old barn on Dolan's personal property, operates using the honor system where visitors are asked to turn on and off the lights as they come and go and are asked to make a donation instead of being charged admission.

== Philosophy department ==
The philosophy department at The Museum of Everyday Life creates various articles, manifestos, and meditations about the theories surrounding people and their relationship to everyday objects, methods of museum curation, and encyclopedism that are not professionally published but are put out at no cost to visitors. Philosophers at the museum also research exhibition themes and create materials to support the mission of the museum. Philosophers include Dolan herself as well as rotating artists in residence. Residencies are open to the public through application and can last anywhere from two weeks to a month where artists and philosophers will create and help research works and upcoming exhibits for the museum.

== First Manifesto ==
The First Manifesto outlines the reason for the museum's existence and their philosophies as an institution. It adds to the overall mission of the museum by reiterating that the purpose of this museum is to glorify the mundanity of the everyday. The introduction to this manifesto states:

No More Vitrines! Nothing Under Glass!

Down with the fetishistic worship of "authentic" works by the Famous!

Down with the sanctification of the "Original"!

Down with all things valuable and antique!

Up with a new kind of museum, living and breathing and as common as dirt!

Up with the Museum of Everyday Life!

== Performance company ==
The Museum of Everyday Life features a performance company which specializes in parades, cantastoria, and toy theater all in connection with its effort to examine and analyze the human connection with regular objects. The company prides itself on creating many different kinds of performances that utilize traditional methods but that can be performed anywhere from small indoor venues to large outdoor amphitheaters. The Museum of Everyday Life often partners with the Banners and Cranks festival to put on these performances, of which Clare Dolan is a co-founder.

== Exhibitions and collections ==
The exhibits are the main focus of the Museum of Everyday Life and feature both permanent collections as well as rotating, seasonal displays. The museum relies heavily on the input from community members, artists, residents, and fans of the museum to make these exhibits possible. They often seek outside donations of materials to display as well as volunteers to help set up and curate new attractions, and maintain the existing pieces. Though guided tours can be arranged, the museum is mostly self serviced and visitors are asked to turn on the lights when they enter and to remember to turn them off when they exit.

As of October of 2020, the newest exhibit is titled 'Frayed Knot: the human art of tying and untying' and features many different uses and applications of rope and knots, from shoe laces to surgical sutures. It also looks at the lesser thought about aspects of knot tying like the friction that is necessary to make a knot bind together and how we interpret and use that phenomenon linguistically to describe unpleasant sensations as 'knots in our stomachs'.

== Founder ==
Clare Dolan was a company member with Bread and Puppet Theater for 12 years and continues to maintain a relationship with them, helping with performances and exhibits for their museum. She now travels and gives talks and presentations on her work with the Museum of Everyday Life, as well as being a full time nurse. Dolan also co-founded and organizes a traveling cantastoria performance festival called Banners and Cranks.
