= Willoughby State Forest =

State Forest in Caledonia and Orleans counties, Vermont

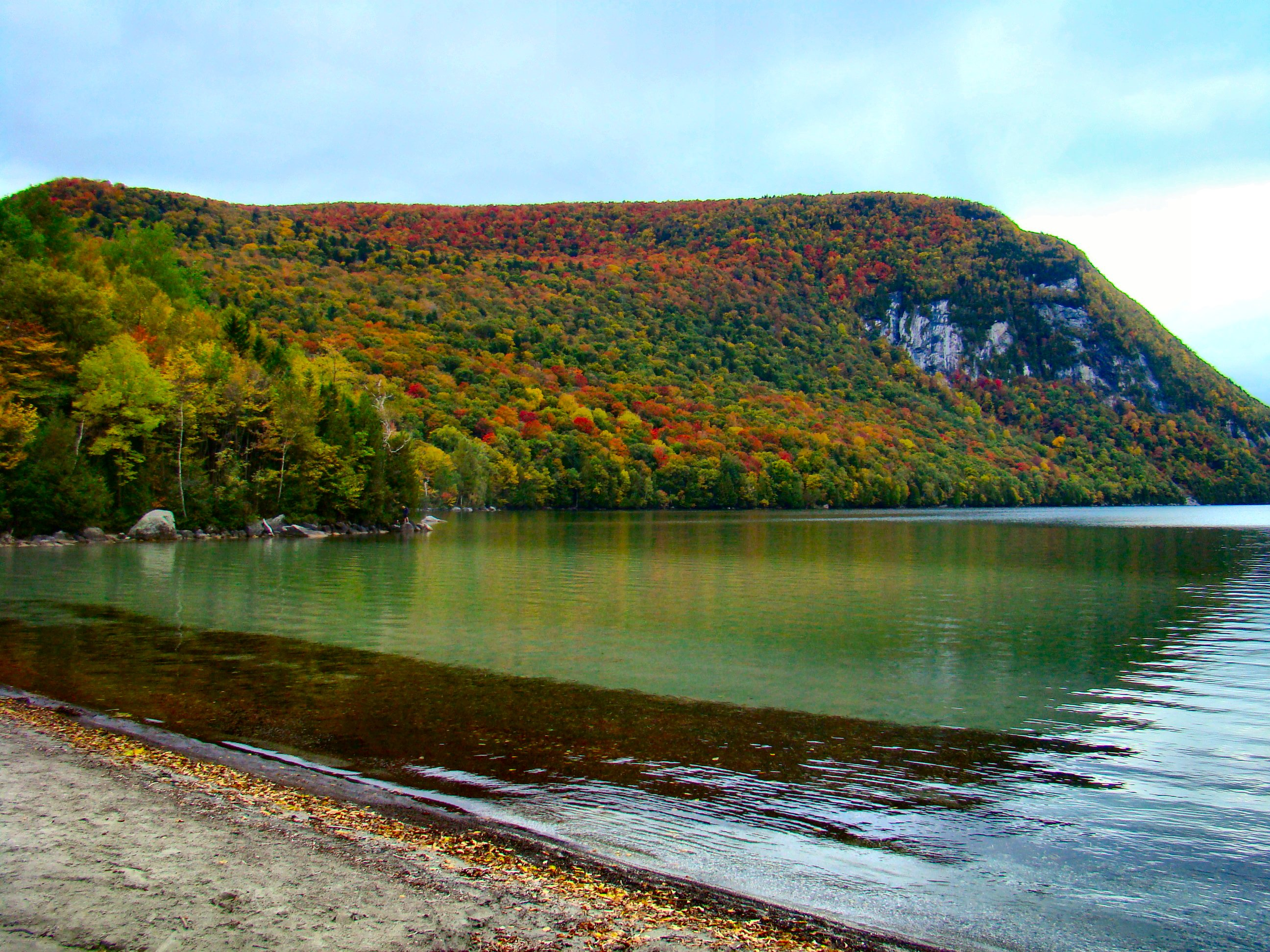
- Lake Willoughby with a view of Mount Hor in Willoughby State Forest
- Interactive map of Willoughby State Forest
- Type: State forest
- Location: Caledonia and Orleans County, Vermont
- Coordinates: 44.71529°N 72.0628°W
- Area: 7,682 acres (31.09 km^{2})
- Created: 1928
- Operator: Vermont Department of Forests, Parks, and Recreation
- Website: Website

Willoughby State Forest covers 7,682 acres (31.09 km^{2}) in Newark, Sutton and Westmore in Caledonia and Orleans counties in Vermont. The forest is managed by the Vermont Department of Forests, Parks, and Recreation. Activities include hiking, primitive camping, cross country skiing, snowshoeing, hunting and fishing.

== Features ==
Willoughby State Forest is easily accessible from State Routes 5 and 5A and is bisected by Lake Willoughby, with Mount Hor (2648 feet) to the west and Mount Pisgah (2751 feet) to the east. It is located on the divide between the Saint Lawrence and Connecticut River watersheds. The highest peak in the forest is Bald Mountain at 3315 feet in elevation.

Willoughby State Forest contains two natural areas: Willoughby Cliffs Natural Area in Westmore (950 acres) and Marl Pond and Swamp Natural Area in Sutton (30 acres).
