= Mount Hor (Vermont) =

Mountain in Vermont, United States

Coordinates: 44°42′48″N 72°03′11″W

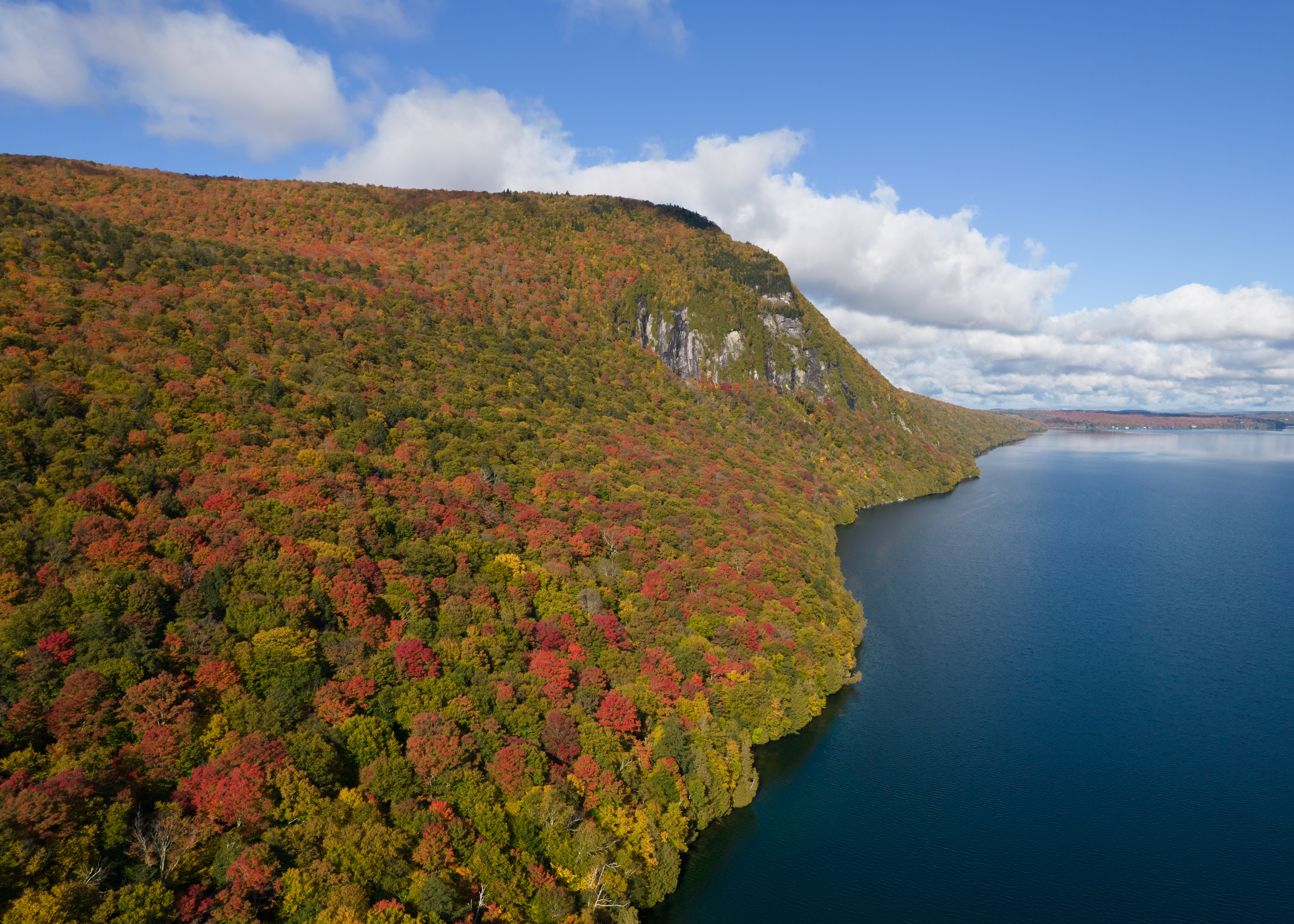
Aerial view of Mount Hor from the south

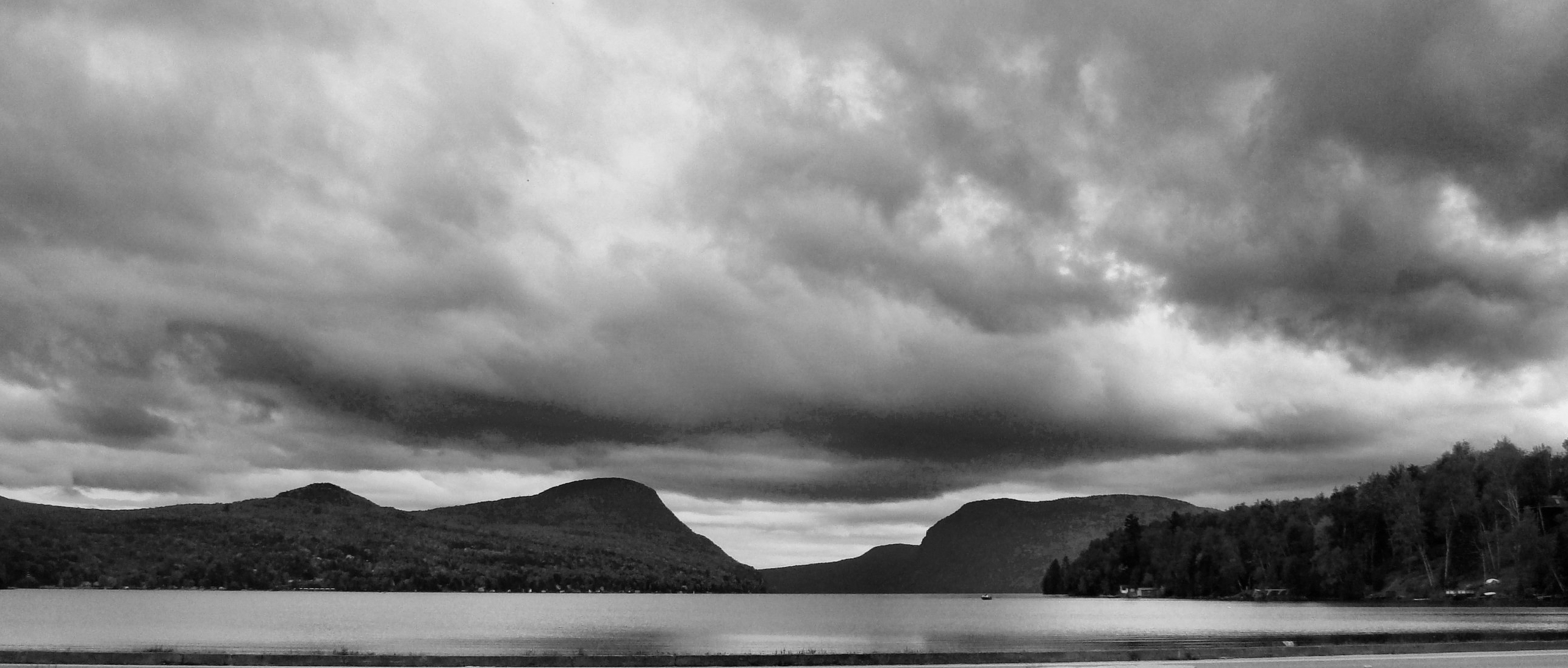
Willoughby Gap from the north, with Mount Hor to the right of the gap

Mount Hor is a mountain in Sutton, Vermont. It is part of the Northeastern Highlands of Vermont. It is located on the west side of Lake Willoughby and constitutes the west side of "Willoughby Notch" ("Willoughby Gap"). There are hiking trails in Willoughby State Forest.

Mount Hor is the subject of a poem by Robert Frost. "The Mountain" appears in Frost's second book of poetry, North of Boston (1914).

== See also ==
- Mount Pisgah (Vermont)
