= Stephen Bliss =

American politician (1787–1847)

Member of the Illinois Senate from the Edwards County district
- In office 1824 – 1828

Personal details
- Born: March 27, 1787 Lebanon, New Hampshire
- Died: December 6, 1847 (aged 60)
- Spouse: Elizabeth Worcester
- Children: 2
- Profession: Presbyterian minister

Stephen Bliss (March 27, 1787 – December 6, 1847) was an American Presbyterian minister and politician from New Hampshire. Adopted by a pastor uncle, Bliss graduated from Middlebury College, but failed to get licensed to preach. He then taught in New York before moving to Illinois along the Wabash River. Bliss spent the rest of his life in the region, eventually earning a license and ordination to preach with the Presbyterian church. Bliss also served two terms in the Illinois Senate.

== Biography ==
Stephen Bliss was born in Lebanon, New Hampshire, on March 27, 1787. He was the third son of five born to his parents, who struggled to provide for the family. They later moved to Glover, Vermont. In his teenage years, Bliss was adopted by his uncle, Congregationalist pastor Samuel Wood. Wood prepared Bliss for study at Middlebury College; Bliss graduated from there in 1812. Bliss then continued to study under Wood for two years, then applied to the Hopkinton Association for a license to preach. However, the association denied the application, and Bliss decided to instead focus on teaching. With a friend from college, George May, Bliss taught throughout eastern and central New York.

Bliss' health began to fail in 1818, so he and May decided to move out west. They settled in Palmyra, Edwards County, Illinois, a town 3 miles (4.8 km) north of Mount Carmel. On April 11, 1819, they opened a Sunday school, one of the first in the state. Bliss returned to New Hampshire in the fall of 1820, then returned the next spring with his wife. Although Bliss did not seek it, his application with the Hopkinton Association was reviewed and he was approved for a license. He was named an elder of the First Presbyterian Church of Edwards County (later known as Wabash Presbyterian Church) when it was founded in 1822. On August 3, 1823, Bliss gave his first sermon at the church.

Bliss then traveled throughout the county to preach. He quickly earned a reputation and drew large crowds. In 1824, Bliss was elected to the Illinois Senate. The next April, he was officially licensed as a Presbyterian minister in Washington, Indiana. Bliss assumed control of two vacant churches in Indiana—one in Carlisle and one in Fort Harrison—providing one sermon a month. He preached at the church in Edwards County on the other Sundays. On August 4, 1825, Bliss was ordained at a meeting of the Presbytery in Vincennes, Indiana. Bliss was re-elected to the Illinois Senate in 1826, serving a final two-year term. Bliss then spent the rest of his life preaching on a circuit in Illinois along the Wabash River. He supported himself with a farm and church donations.

Stephen Bliss married Elizabeth Worcester, the daughter of Noah Worcester, on April 20, 1821. They had one son and one daughter; Elizabeth died on May 21, 1837. Bliss died on December 6, 1847. In 1875, the citizens of the area erected a monument dedicated to Bliss and his wife. Their remains are in Wabash Presbyterian Church Cemetery.
