= Charles Clark Jamieson =

American officer and engineer

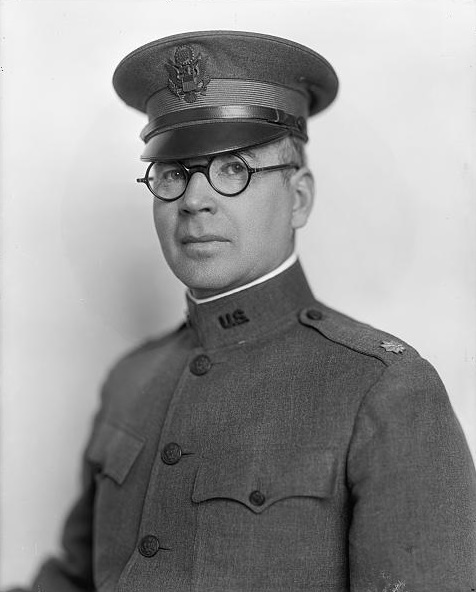
- Harris and Ewing Collection, Library of Congress
- Born: November 3, 1866; Glover, Vermont, US
- Died: August 21, 1935 (aged 68); Ocala, Florida, US
- Burial place: West Point Cemetery, West Point, New York, US
- Education: Johnson Normal School; United States Military Academy
- Spouse(s): Frances P. Floyd (1894-1923, her death); Anne Uezzel (1930-1935, his death)
- Children: 2
- Military career
- Allegiance: United States
- Branch: United States Army
- Service years: 1892–1910, 1917–1919
- Rank: Brigadier General
- Service number: 0-13823
- Units: U.S. Army Infantry Branch; U.S. Army Ordnance Corps
- Conflicts: World War I
- Other work: Engineer

Charles Clark Jamieson was a (November 3, 1866 – August 21, 1935) was an American engineer and officer in the United States Army. A veteran of World War I, he attained the rank of brigadier general during the war.

== Early life and education ==
Charles Clark Jamieson was born in Glover, Vermont on November 3, 1866, the son of William S. and Isabella (McDowell) Jamieson. He was raised and educated in Stannard, Vermont, then attended the State Normal School in Johnson from 1882 to 1885. After graduating, he taught school in West Burke. In 1888, Jamieson began attendance at the United States Military Academy, from which he graduated in 1892.

== Career ==
Jamieson served with the 15th Infantry and was stationed at Fort Sheridan from 1892 to 1895. From 1897 to 1900, he was assigned to the Sandy Hook Proving Ground. From 1900 to 1903, Jamieson taught at the United States Military Academy. He then was transferred to the Rock Island Arsenal.

Jamieson received a promotion to major with the Ordnance Department on June 25, 1906. He incurred a disability in the line of duty and retired as a major on October 12, 1910.

As a civilian, Jamieson worked as a manufacturing manager and mechanical engineer, first with the Walter A. Wood Mowing and Reaping Machine Company in Hoosick Falls, New York, from 1910 to 1913 and then for Deere & Co. until 1916. He then became a consulting engineer and partner with Goethals, Houston & Jay, with offices in New York, working with fellow West Point graduate George W. Goethals.

On April 13, 1917, Jamieson was recalled to active duty with the Ordnance Department. On January 3, 1919, he retired as a brigadier general and returned to George W. Goethals and Company as vice president and Partner. In 1923, he again became a consulting engineer, splitting his time between New York and Jacksonville, Florida.

== Personal life ==
Jamieson married Frances Parmalee Floyd on June 12, 1894. They were the parents of two children. Frances died on July 20, 1923, and on July 12, 1930, Jamieson married Anne Uezzel.

== Death and legacy ==
Jamieson died in Ocala, Florida, on August 21, 1935. He was buried at West Point Cemetery in West Point, New York.
