= Lake Parker (Vermont) =

Lake in Orleans County, Vermont, United States

Parker Pond
- Location within Vermont Location within the United States
- Location: West Glover, Orleans County, Vermont
- Coordinates: 44°43′09″N 72°14′02″W
- Primary outflows: Roaring Brook
- Basin countries: United States
- Max. length: 1 mi (1.6 km)
- Max. width: 0.5 mi (0.80 km)
- Surface area: 239 acres (0.97 km^{2})
- Max. depth: 48 ft (15 m)
- Surface elevation: 1,302 ft (397 m)

Lake Parker is located in the northwest corner of West Glover, Orleans County, Vermont in an area known as the Northeast Kingdom. This freshwater lake covers 239 acres (0.97 km^{2}) and is just over one mile (1.6 km) long and one-half mile wide; its maximum depth is 48 feet (15 m). The lake is fed by two primary streams and outlets into Roaring Brook, which empties into the Barton River, Lake Memphremagog and, eventually, Canada's St. Lawrence River. It is bordered on three sides by seasonal homes; the southern end is a natural estuary sheltering waterfowl. The surrounding land is farmed for raising dairy cattle.
