= Lake Parker (Lake Wales, Florida) =

- Location within Florida Location within the United States
- Location: west of Lake Wales, Florida
- Coordinates: 27.9139°N 81.6376°W
- Type: natural freshwater lake
- Basin countries: United States
- Max. length: 2,875 feet (876 m)
- Max. width: 2,335 feet (712 m)
- Surface area: 134 acres (54 ha)
- Surface elevation: 121 feet (37 m)

Lake Parker is an oval-shaped natural freshwater lake 2 miles (3.2 km) west of Lake Wales, Florida. It has a 134-acre (540,000 m^{2}) surface area and it in a rural area. On its north and northeast is pastureland, on its northwest is a citrus grove and on its west are small farms. On its southwest are a row of residences along Albritton Way. Old Bartow Road passes to Lake Parker's immediate south and on its southeast is a large cleared area with a gated road where a gated community was planned, but never built.

There is public access along Old Bartow Road. Most of this area is heavily wooded. In a break in the woods on the southwest is an unpaved and apparently unofficial boat ramp. The lake has no public swimming areas. The Hook and Bullet website says River Lake contains largemouth bass.
