= Mount Pisgah (Vermont) =

Mountain in Orleans County, Vermont, United States

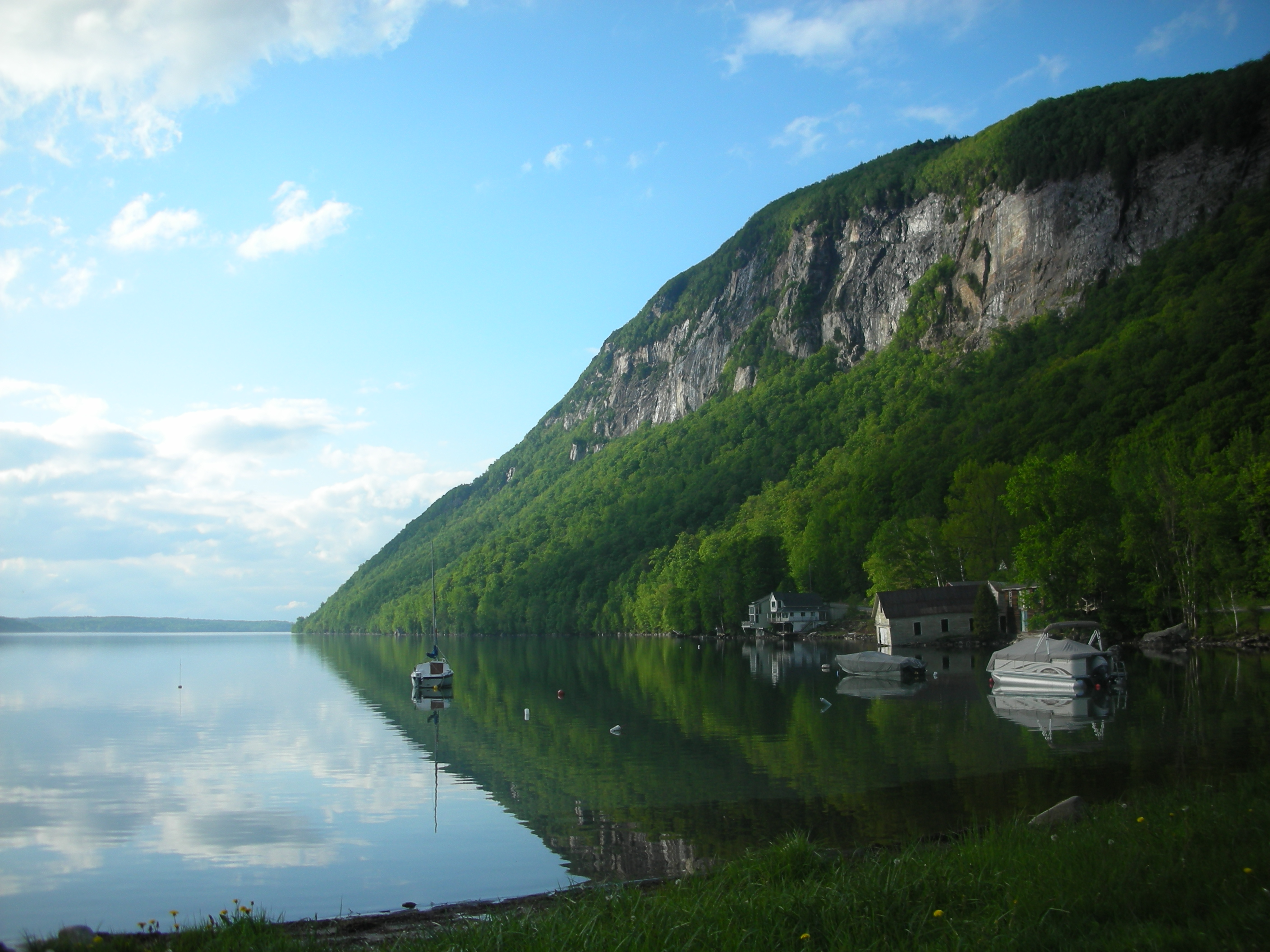
- Mount Pisgah from the south, overlooking Lake Willoughby

Highest point
- Elevation: 2,785 ft (849 m)
- Coordinates: 44°43′47″N 72°01′51″W

Geography
- Location: Northeast Kingdom, Vermont, U.S.
- Topo map: USGS Mount Pisgah

Mount Pisgah is a mountain in Westmore, Vermont. It is located on the east side of Lake Willoughby and constitutes the eastern side of "Willoughby Gap" ("Willoughby Notch"). It is part of the Northeastern Highlands of Vermont. There are hiking trails in Willoughby State Forest.

The cliffs contain alpine plants protected because no trails lead to or through them.

== Hiking ==
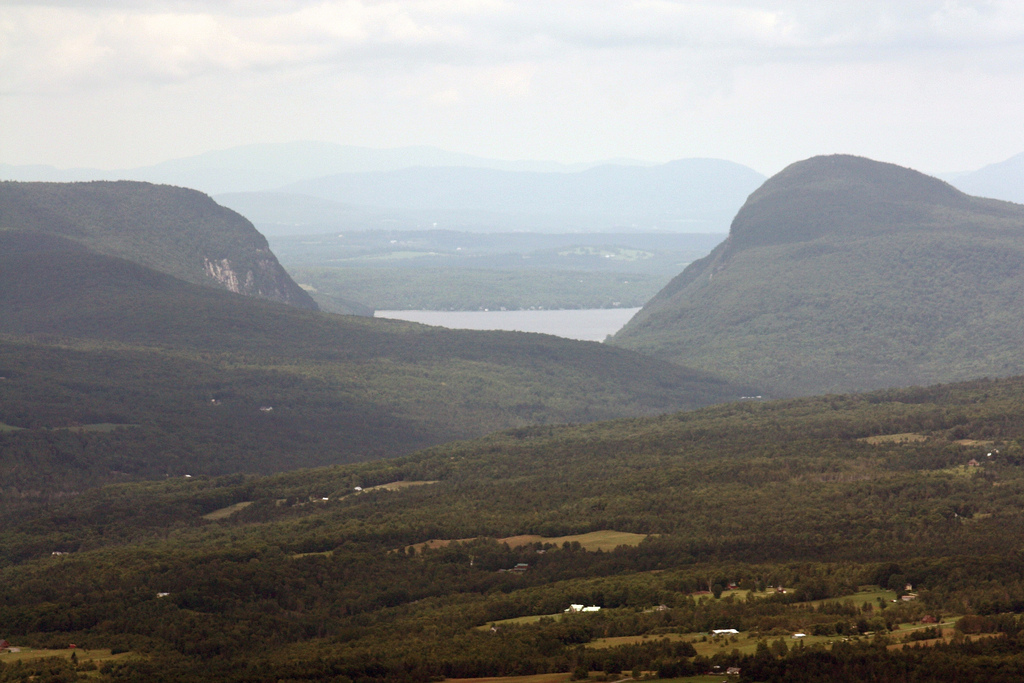
Willoughby Notch viewed from the south. Mount Pisgah is to the right.

There is a trail parking area located on the west side of Vermont Route 5A at the south end of Lake Willoughby. The trailhead is marked by a sign on the opposite side of the road.

After roughly 1 mile (1.6 km), the main trail passes Pulpit Rock, a known nesting area for the peregrine falcon. Pulpit Rock also offers an expansive view of Lake Willoughby. An extension off the Pulpit Rock location leads to a rock overhang 650 feet (200 m) above the lake.

After leaving Pulpit Rock, the trail veers away from the cliffs to ascend to a viewing area on a rock slab.

The main hiking trail runs along a ridge bearing east away from the lake and curves back to the parking area. The descent trail offers three separate, small lookout areas.

The trail's total distance is 2.5 miles (4.0 km) with a vertical rise of 1,590 feet (480 m).

== See also ==
- Lake Willoughby
- Mount Hor (Vermont)
