= Lake Willoughby =

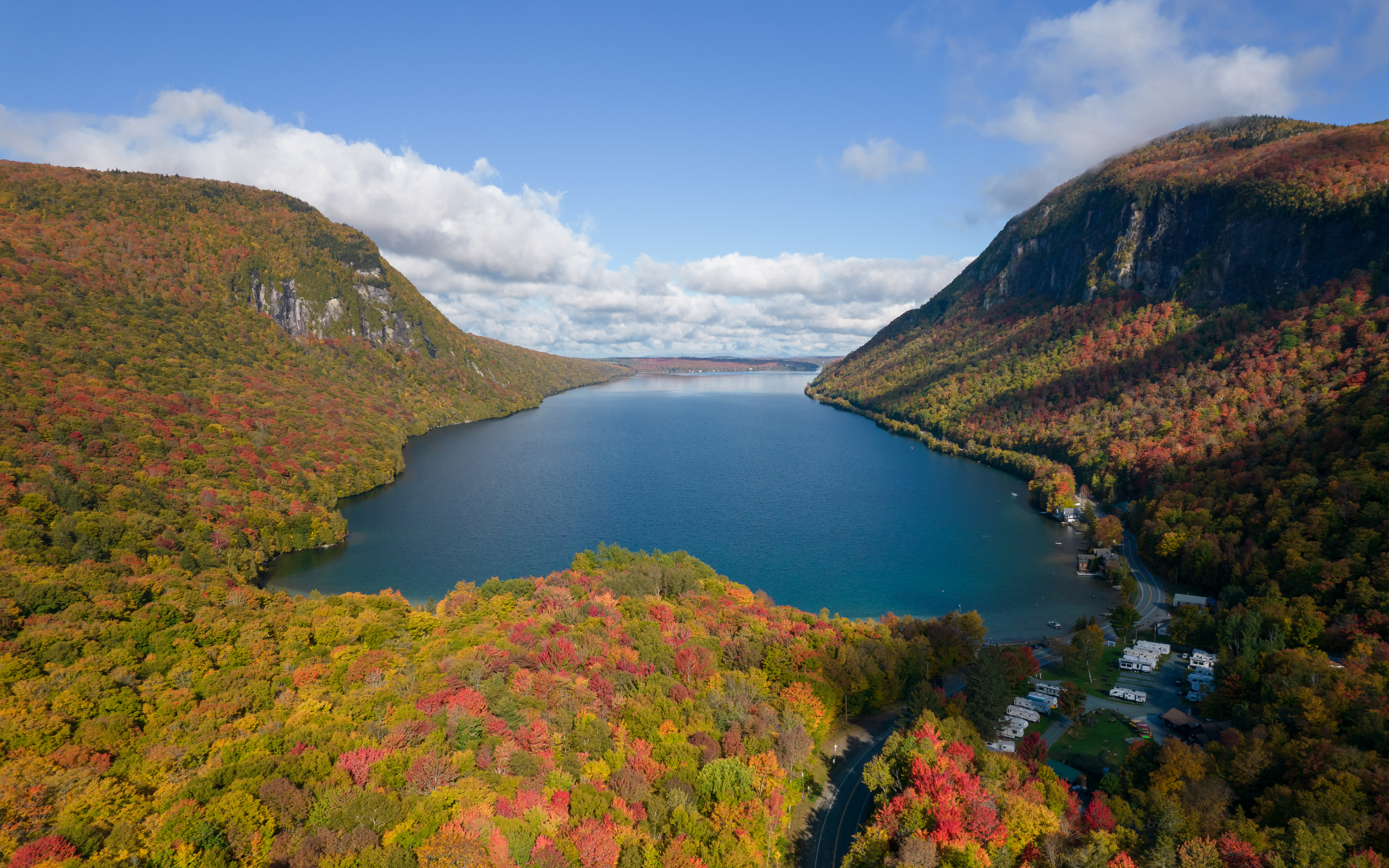
- Looking north from above south shore of Lake Willoughby, with Mount Hor on the left and Mount Pisgah on the right

- Location within Vermont Location within the United States
- Location: Orleans County, Vermont, U.S.
- Coordinates: 44°45′07″N 72°03′46″W
- Type: glacial lake (ice age)
- Primary inflows: glacial aquifer.
- Primary outflows: Willoughby River (creek)
- Catchment area: Lake Memphramagog, Gulf of St. Lawrence, Atlantic Ocean
- Basin countries: United States
- Max. length: 5 miles (8.0 km)
- Max. width: 1 mile (1.6 km)
- Surface area: 1,687 acres (683 ha)
- Average depth: 185 feet (56 m)
- Max. depth: 300 feet (91 m) (approximation)
- Surface elevation: 1,171 feet (357 m)

U.S. National Natural Landmark
- Designated: 1967

Lake Willoughby is a glacial lake located in the town of Westmore in Orleans County in the Northeast Kingdom of Vermont, United States.

The lake's southern end is surrounded by the Willoughby State Forest. This state forest includes Mount Pisgah, Mount Hor, collectively "Willoughby Gap".

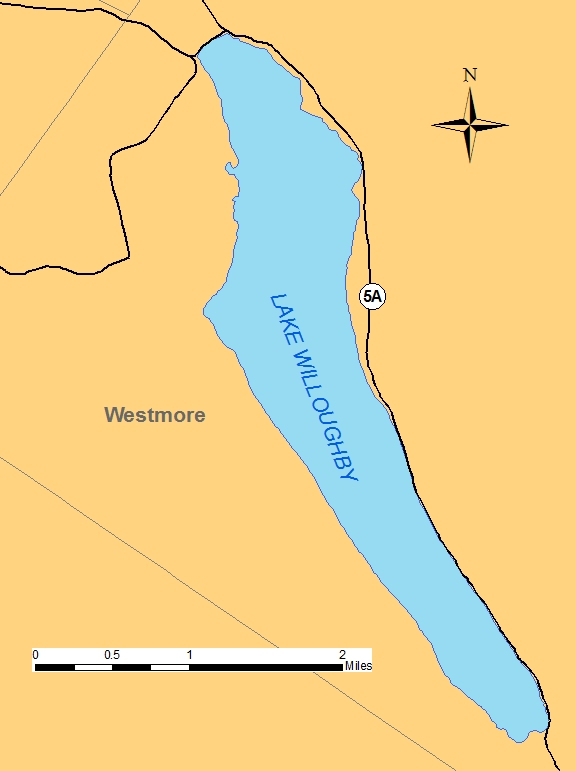
The lake is about 5 miles (8.0 km) long

In 2010, the magazine Yankee named Willoughby as the third best lake in New England.

Willoughby Lake has a public beach that stretches 0.4 kilometres (0.25 mi) on the north shore of the lake, or in the zone of the lake outlet. Another public beach is located at the bottom of the South Bay of the Lake. The village of Westmore is located on the east side, at the confluence area of Mill Creek which drains the waters of Long Pond. Many cottages and houses are located on North-East bank of the lake.

== Hydrology ==
The lake is known for its clarity and chilly temperature. Because of its depth, the surface of the lake freezes later than other lakes in the Northeast Kingdom.

== Watershed ==
Willoughby Lake is part of the Saint-François River watershed, its waters eventually reaching the St. Lawrence River in Canada. Willoughby River is the outlet from the lake and runs north through Brownington to feed into the Barton River. The Barton River is a tributary to Lake Memphremagog and thence to the Magog River, then the Saint-François River, then the St. Lawrence River, and ultimately to the Gulf of St. Lawrence.

Prior to the floods of 1927, the river had three dams. All were destroyed by the flood. An iron bridge that ran from Evansville to Brownington Center was destroyed and rebuilt.

A dam where the Whetstone Dam had formerly stood, was rebuilt to run a sawmill, which was still in operation in 2008. The "state Fish and Game Department" bought the dam rights to allow rainbow trout to swim upriver.

== Geology ==
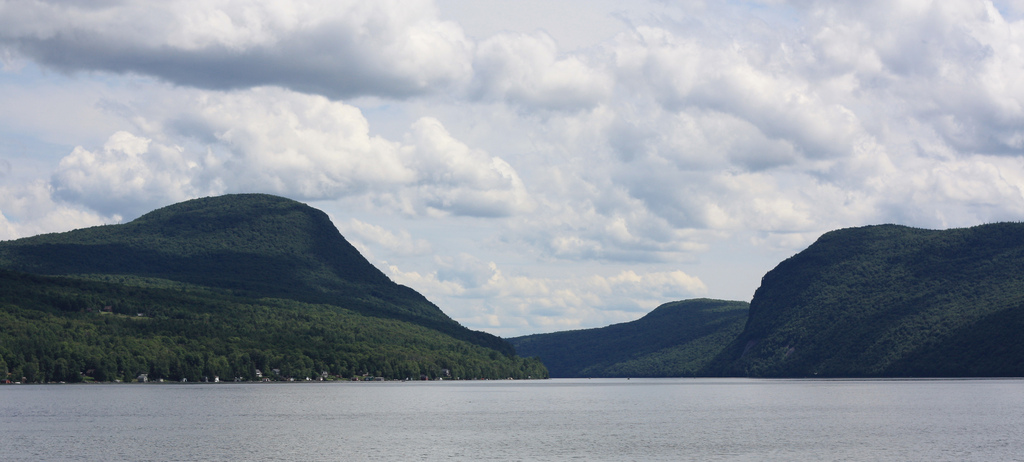
A view from the north end of the lake shows Mount Pisgah (left) and Mount Hor rising up above the surface.

Lake Willoughby is a southeast trending basin. Willoughby is over 300 feet (91 m) deep in places, making it potentially the deepest lake entirely contained within New England, and second in the area to only Lake Champlain, whose deepest point reaches around 400 feet (120 m). Estimates for the lake's depth range from 300 feet (91 m) on the low end, to as much as 340 feet (100 m) on the high end.

The shoreline of Lake Willoughby almost resembles a Norwegian fjord, and as a result is a popular destination for photographers and tourists. The reason for this unique geology is likely due to the rock between Mount Pisgah on the east and Mount Hor on the west being eroded by an ancient valley ice lobe. This ice flow cut across the Willoughby granodiorite and adjacent metamorphic rocks. The ice flow may have exploited highly fractured bedrock along the margin of the Willoughby pluton or joint surfaces within the pluton.

Other mountains in territory of Westmore, Vermont are on:

- East bank: Mount Hedgehog (Vermont) (high: 652 metres (2,139 ft)), Mount Goodwin (Vermont) (high: 873 metres (2,864 ft)), Mount Bald (Vermont) (high: 1,003 metres (3,291 ft)), Mount Heystack (Vermont) (high: 794 metres (2,605 ft)) and Mount McSherry (Vermont) (high: 733 metres (2,405 ft));
- West bank: Mount Wheeler (Vermont) (high: 711 metres (2,333 ft)) in Caledonia County, Mount Valley (Vermont) (high: 563 metres (1,847 ft)), Mount May Pond (Vermont) (high: 623 metres (2,044 ft));
- South bank: Mount Bartlett (Vermont) (high: 621 metres (2,037 ft)) in Caledonia County.

== Natural history ==
Willoughby is listed as a National Natural Landmark. Willoughby contains rainbow trout (wild and stocked), lake trout, landlocked Atlantic salmon (mainly stocked), rainbow smelt, burbot, yellow perch, longnose sucker, white sucker, lake chub, common shiner, and round whitefish, which is a native species of extremely limited distribution in Vermont. Steelhead trout (rainbow trout) are not native to the region, but were imported to Lake Memphremagog from the Pacific Northwest. They migrate up the Barton River and Willoughby River to the lake to spawn.

The sheer cliffs of Mount Pisgah and Mount Hor provide an environment conducive for arctic and cliff-alpine plants, as well as ideal nesting areas for the rare peregrine falcon.

More than 100 bird species have been recorded around the lake including thrushes, warblers, hummingbirds, jays, finches, loons, herons, and gulls.

== History ==
Tiny steam boats operated on the lake for tourists from 1884 to the early 1900s when steam was replaced by the gasoline engine.

In 1915, Robert Frost mentioned the lake in a poem, "A Servant to Servants":

I see it's a fair, pretty sheet of water,
Our Willoughby! How did you hear of it?
I expect, though, everyone's heard of it.
In a book about ferns? Listen to that!

== Toponymy ==
The toponym "lake Willoughby" was officially recognized on September 1, 1992, by GNIS (Geographic Names Information System) of United States.

== Local customs and culture ==
Devil's Rock, located on the Mount Pisgah side of the lake at a less than halfway point from the lake's southern beach, is a popular diving spot for daring locals and vacationers. It takes its name from a painted image of a devil on the front of the rock facing out toward the lake. It is also called Devil's Rock because when reflected in still water, the image of a skull lying on its side can be seen.

Along the eastern shore, there are a series of natural waterslides that flow into Lake Willoughby. In the winter, these turn into an ice wall which is used by ice climbers.

== Economy ==
Lake facilities offer swimming, hiking, and ice fishing. There is a nude beach on the lake's southern shore. Surrounding the Willoughby Lake, there are some campgrounds and cottage rental services for tourists. The Route 5A runs along the lake's eastern edge.

== See also ==
- Willoughby River
- Westmore, Vermont, a municipality
- Orleans County, Vermont
