= Barton (village), Vermont =

Barton, Vermont
- Village
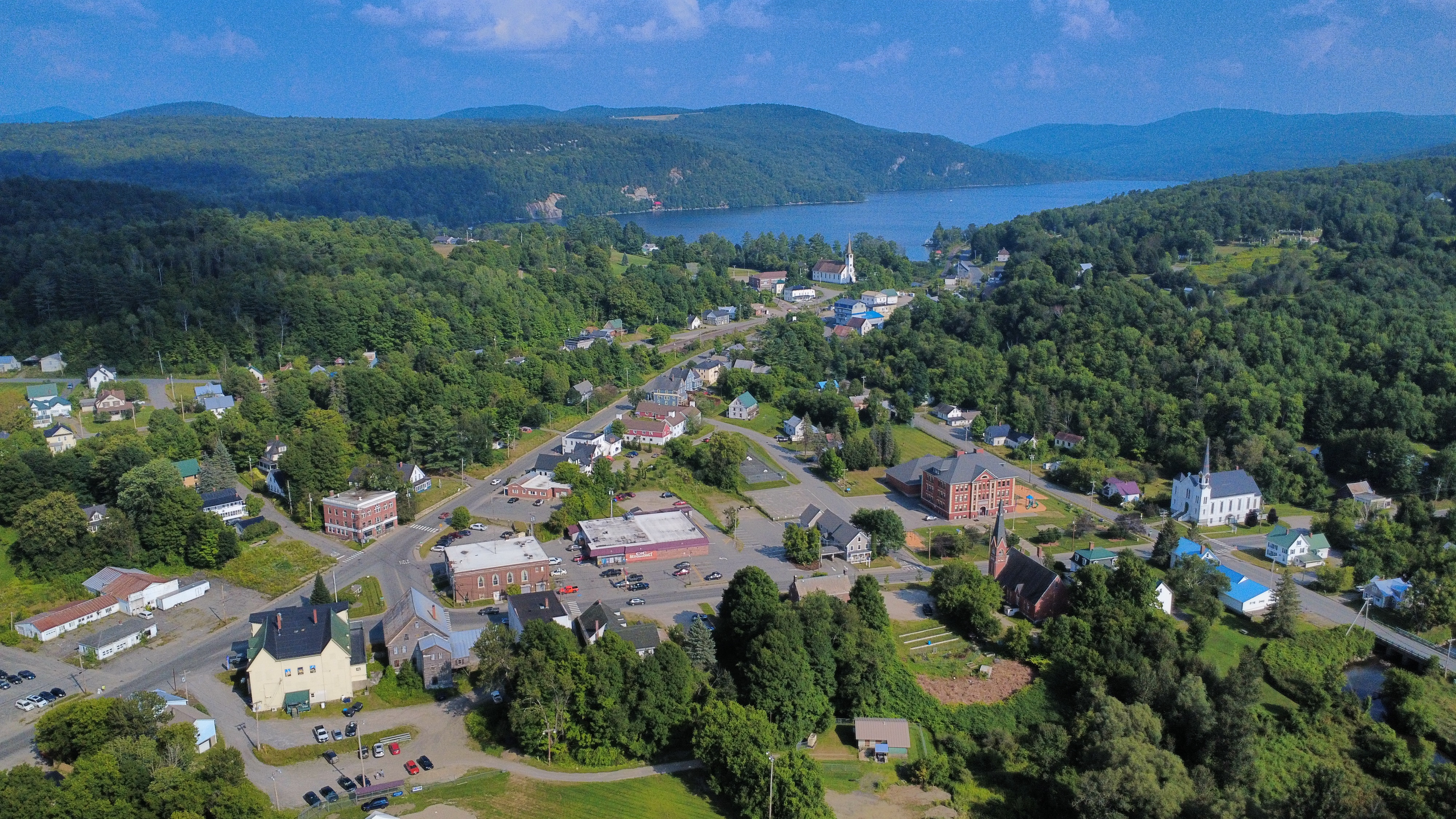
- View of Barton, VT, from the west

- Location within the state of Vermont Barton (the United States)
- Coordinates: 44°45′01″N 72°10′37″W
- Country: United States
- State: Vermont
- County: Orleans
- Town: Barton

Area
  - Total: 1.14 sq mi (2.96 km^{2})
  - Land: 1.13 sq mi (2.93 km^{2})
  - Water: 0.012 sq mi (0.03 km^{2})
- Elevation: 873 ft (266 m)

Population (2020)
  - Total: 690
  - Density: 610/sq mi (235.5/km^{2})
- Time zone: UTC-5 (Eastern (EST))
  - Summer (DST): UTC-4 (EDT)
- ZIP codes: 05822
- Area code: 802
- FIPS code: 50-03475
- GNIS feature ID: 2378299
- Website: bartonvt.com

Barton is a village located near the center of the town of Barton, in Orleans County, Vermont, United States. The population was 690 at the 2020 census.

== History ==
In the 19th century, the village was the economic center of the county. Prior to incorporation, the village had been known as "Barton Mills." Tourists from Boston and New York arrived by train and could register in one of three major hotels. The village was incorporated on November 21, 1874.

Fire permanently reshaped the village, starting with the 1883 destruction of the building on the site now occupied by the Pierce Building. The hotels were destroyed, mostly by fire, in 1967 and 1971. The Pierce Block was built in 1885 and is still being used for commercial purposes, one of the few business buildings to survive the multitude of fires that the village has experienced. In 1889, a waterworks was constructed using May Pond. Presumably sewage disposal was constructed concurrently. Water was needed to extinguish fires. Villagers had long been frustrated by their inability to quench fires with existing cisterns, which were replaced by fire hydrants.

In 1895, the village constructed a hydroelectric plant on the Clyde River in West Charleston.

An Indian burial ground was discovered during the excavation for the new Barton Academy in 1907. There is no record of what happened to those artifacts.

In 1907, a ballpark with 200 seats in the grandstand was constructed at the corner of Park and Elm Streets. A professional village team played there and won the professional state championship over rival Orleans in 1908.

There was heavy flooding in 1927 which severely damaged the village.

A fire on August 11, 1938, destroyed three business blocks. The fire ruined any hope of an industrial revival. The Orleans County Monitor commented that it dealt an "irreparable injury to a community struggling to maintain its position as a secondary business and trade center in Vermont."

Fires consumed buildings housing a butter tub factory (2 fires prior to 1916), the Opera House (1929), a cheese factory (1954), and the Monitor building (1968).

In the late 1970s, the federal and state governments stopped the village from dumping raw sewage into the Barton River. Barton's new treatment plant cost $3.6 million, 90% of which was paid for by state and federal governments. The village was not able to separate out its old storm sewers from the sewage system. This has caused subsequent problems during rainstorms.

The village contains three places on the National Register of Historic Places:

1. Crystal Lake Falls Historic District (August 7, 1994)
2. Crystal Lake State Park listed August 30, 2005
3. King Block — 117 High Street (added July 20, 2002)

An article in the local paper inventoried businesses that had been closed with no expectation of reopening, these included 7 gas stations, an automobile franchise, and two restaurants. One of the problems it cited was the highest water and sewage rates in the county.

== Government ==
In 2009, the village spent $474,557 on village operations alone, not including solely owned utilities.

=== Water system ===
The village maintains its own water system, obtaining water from Pensioner Pond (in Charleston), with 170 acres (0.69 km^{2}), May Pond with 116 acres (0.47 km^{2}), and the Barton Reservoir. The system serves 370 customers. Water rates are $10.61/1,000 US gallons (3,785 L); sewer rates are $16.90/1,000 US gallons (3,785 L). The rates are higher than surrounding towns because of the use of ground water rather than a well.

In 2013, a user consuming 2,000 US gallons (7,600 L; 1,700 imp gal) of water monthly would pay about 3 cents per gallon.

In 2010, the village received two grants totaling over $3.3 million, and two loans totaling over $1 million to upgrade its sewer and storm drainage system.

The 2010 budget for the water department was $214,348. The budget for the waste water department was $318,657.

Estimated annual consumption of water for 2015 ranged from 15,500 to 17,700 cubic feet (440 to 500 m^{3}) for 284 current users.

=== Education ===
The village and surrounding area supports a graded school. In 2005, there were 171 students. 57.9% get free or reduced lunch. The effective spending per pupil was $11,197 in 2008. The average in Vermont was $11,548.

== Geography ==
According to the United States Census Bureau, the village has a total area of 1.4 square miles (3.7 km^{2}), of which 1.2 square miles (3.2 km^{2}) is land and 0.2 square mile (0.5 km^{2}) (12.59%) is water.

Barton owns Pageant Park on Crystal Lake. This was briefly closed in May 2007 until late June 2007.

== Demographics ==
Report looks at wells for Barton
Year	Pop.	±% p.a.
1880	742	—
1890	778	+0.47%
1900	1,050	+3.04%
1910	1,330	+2.39%
1920	1,187	−1.13%
1930	1,363	+1.39%
1940	1,262	−0.77%
1950	1,267	+0.04%
1960	1,169	−0.80%
1970	1,057	−1.00%
1980	1,062	+0.05%
1990	908	−1.55%
2000	742	−2.00%
2005	756	+0.37%
2010	737	−0.51%
2020	690	−0.66%
Source: U.S. Decennial Census

Barton has lost 49% of its population since 1930, dropping from the largest village in Orleans County, to second as of 2020.

As of the Census of 2020, there were residing in the village:

- 690 people and
- 311 households.

The population density was 594.8/sq mi (229.2/km^{2}).

There were 469 housing units at an average density of 372.7/sq mi (143.6/km^{2}).

There were 347 households, out of which

- 44.1% were non-families
- 39.5% were married couples living together
- 38.3% of all households were made up of individuals
- 27.7% had children under the age of 18 living with them,
- 23.3% had someone living alone who was 65 years of age or older
- 12.1% had a female householder with no husband present

The average household size was 2.14 and the average family size was 2.81.

In the village, the population was evenly spread out, with

- 19.1% under the age of 18 (18 year spread)
- 10.1% from 18 to 24 (7 year spread)
- 21.2% from 25 to 44 (20 year spread)
- 27.5% from 45 to 64 (20 year spread)
- 22.0% who were 65 years of age or older

The median age was 44 years. For every 100 females, there were 82.3 males. For every 100 females age 18 and over, there were 82.1 males.

== Economy ==
=== Personal Income ===
The median income as of 2000:

- per family - $32,625
- Males - $27,115
- per household - $21,607
- Females - $18,750

The per capita income for the village was $13,670.

Income below the poverty line:

- Under age 18 - 39.0%
- Older than 64 - 23.7%
- Total Population - 23.2%
- Families - 17.8%

=== Tourism ===
A golf course near the village has been rated by a golfing magazine as one of the "30 best deals" in the country. The 18-hole 5,697 yards (5,209 m) course costs $349/year to join.

=== Utilities and Communication ===
==== Cellphone ====
Barton Village receives Verizon and AT&T Mobility (TDMA and GSM).

==== Electricity ====
Barton Village owns Barton Electric which generates some of its power hydroelectrically and serves not only the village but a large portion of the village side of Barton town, plus West Charleston, North Sutton and much of Westmore. It services 2100 customers. It owns two turbines on the Clyde River in West Charleston.

Projected expenses for 2010 were $2,741,582.

== Culture ==
A sugar on snow party is held each year on the Village Green, the fourth Saturday in July.

=== Library ===
Barton has a library which is open 19 hours a week over four days. It is a non-profit corporation. While the library is self-supporting with separate trustees, it does receive a grant from the town. Its operating income is $42,242. It contains 18,000 books and 35 serial subscriptions. One librarian is a paid professional. The assistants are all volunteers.
