= Westmore, Vermont =

- Town
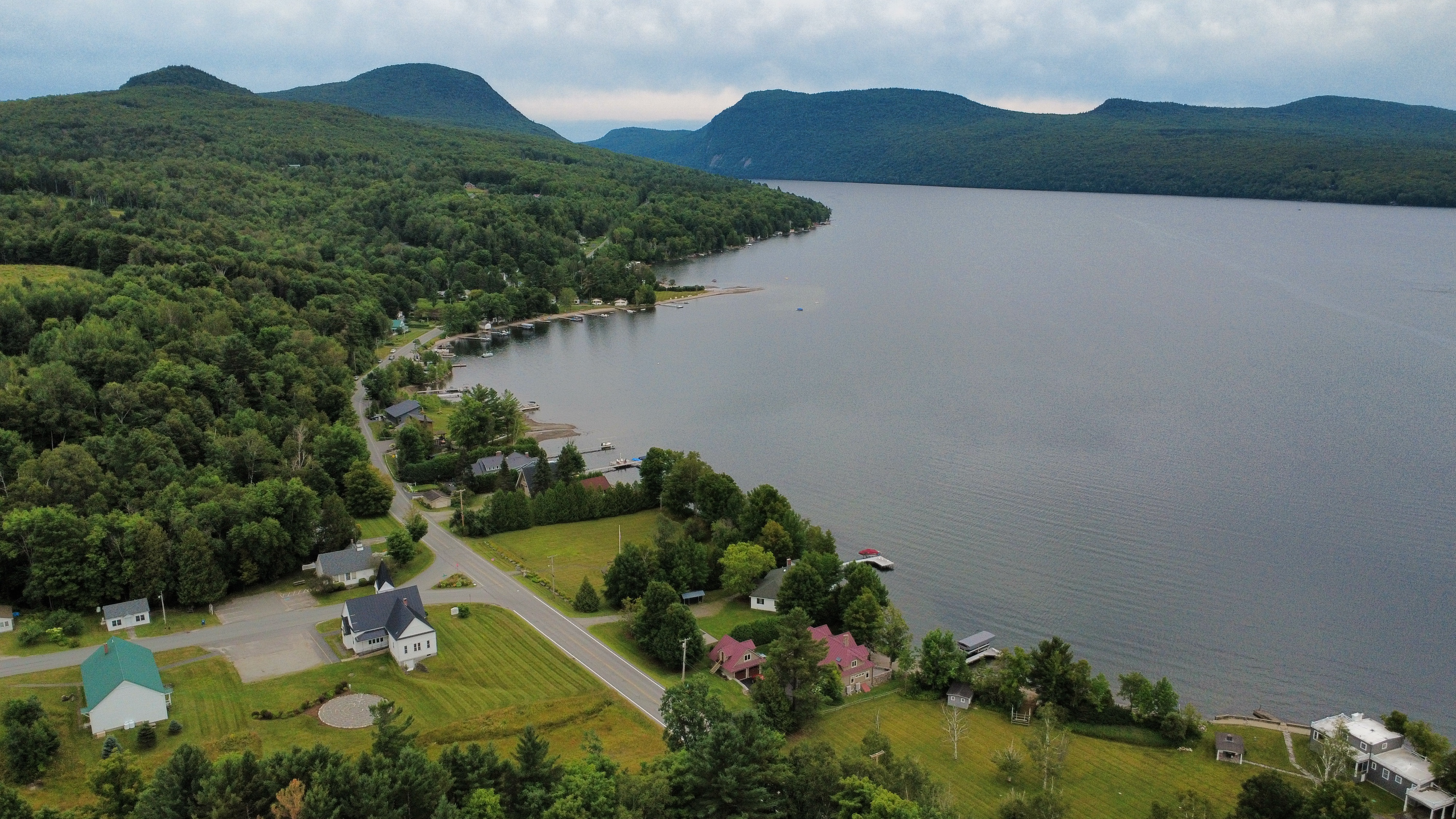
- View of Westmore from the north

- Logo

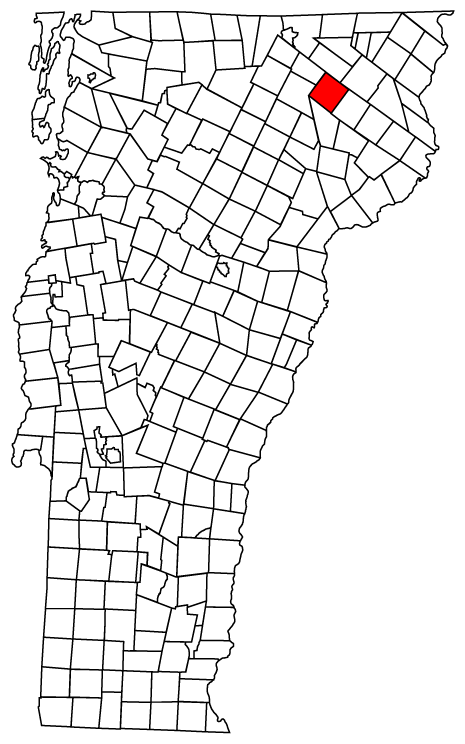
- Located in Orleans County, Vermont
- Coordinates: 44°45′15″N 72°00′24″W
- Country: United States
- State: Vermont
- County: Orleans
- Chartered: August 17, 1781

Area
  - Total: 37.5 sq mi (97.0 km^{2})
  - Land: 34.5 sq mi (89.4 km^{2})
  - Water: 2.9 sq mi (7.6 km^{2})
- Elevation: 1,828 ft (557 m)

Population (2020)
  - Total: 357
  - Density: 10/sq mi (4/km^{2})
- Time zone: UTC-5 (EST)
  - Summer (DST): UTC-4 (EDT)
- ZIP Codes: 05822 (Barton); 05860 (Orleans)
- Area code: 802
- FIPS code: 50-81700
- GNIS feature ID: 1462254
- Website: www.westmoreonline.org

Westmore is a town in Orleans County, Vermont, United States. The population was 357 at the 2020 census, making it the least populated and least densely populated town in the county. The town contains one unincorporated village clustered around Lake Willoughby.

== History ==
Originally named Westford, the town was chartered on August 17, 1781. Since Chittenden County had a town named Westford, in 1787 the name was changed to Westmore.

The first vacation house was built on the lake in 1860. It is known as the Cheney House, named after an owner in the late 19th century.

Westmore never attracted many settlers. The town's peak population was in the census year of 1880 with 485 people.

Before he became famous, Robert Frost camped here in the summer of 1909 with his family.

Songadeewin Camp for girls was located here from 1921 to 1975.

Electricity became available at the south end of the lake, from West Burke, c. 1934.

In 1970, the state of Vermont acquired 7,600 acres (3,100 ha) as part of Willoughby State Forest, which included the Cheney House.

Nudity is legal throughout Vermont, though in 2007–2008, the town discussed whether to ban nudity, aimed at sunbathers on the south beach of Lake Willoughby.

Having closely approximated the state's voting percentages for governor, in 2006, and president in 2004, Westmore was considered one of six "bellwether" towns for the 2008 general election.

== Geography ==
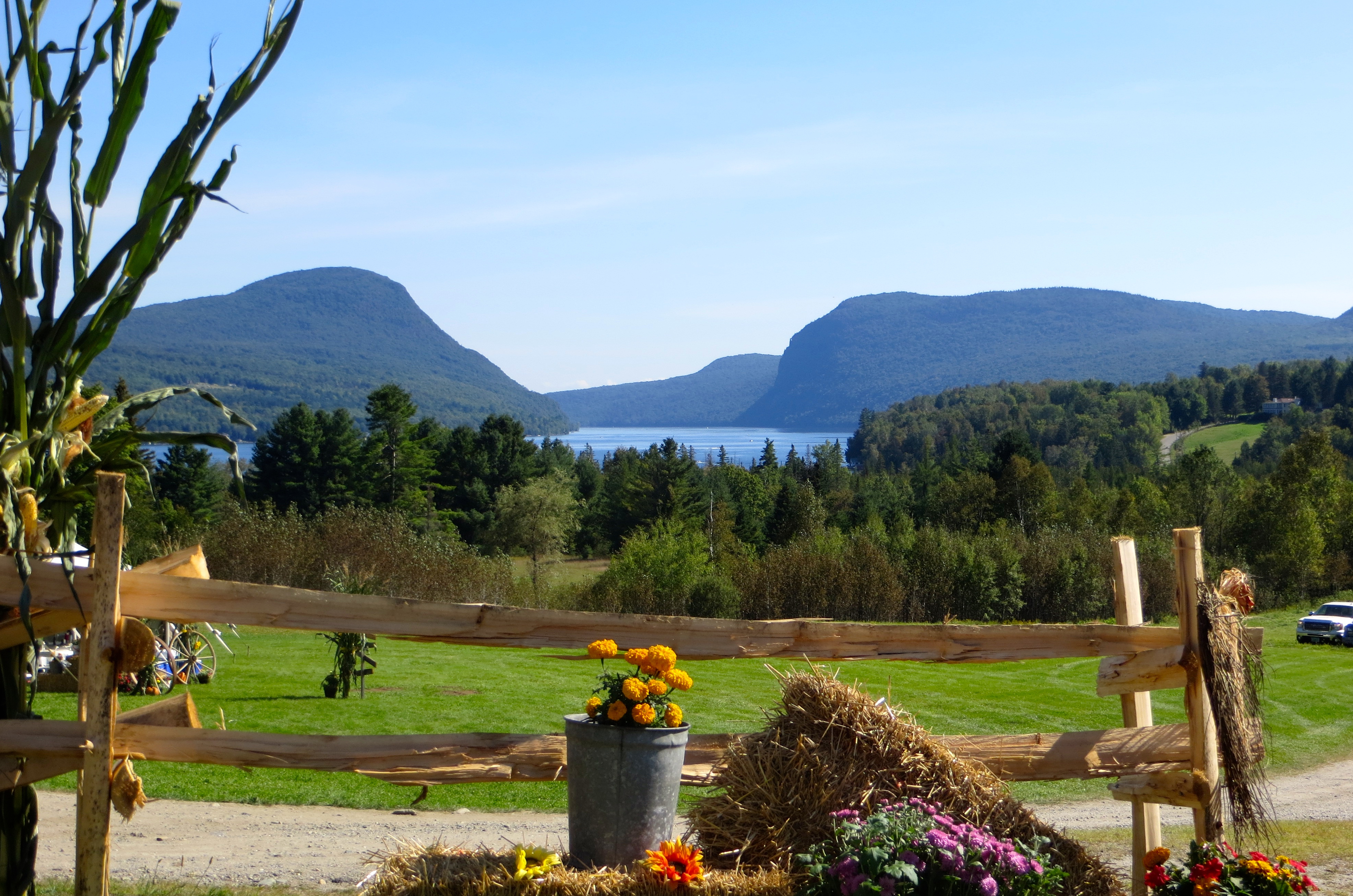
Westmore, Vermont (Mount Pisgah, Lake Willoughby, Mount Hor)

According to the United States Census Bureau, the town has a total area of 37.5 square miles (97.0 km^{2}), of which 34.5 square miles (89.4 km^{2}) is land and 2.9 square miles (7.6 km^{2}) (7.85%) is water.

One of the town's most prominent features is Lake Willoughby. The relatively young 12,000-year-old glacier-carved lake is flanked on the east by Mount Pisgah 2,752 feet (839 m) and the west by Mount Hor 2,654 feet (809 m). The mountains, which have hundreds of feet of rock cliffs, are located in the Willoughby State Forest and the cliffs have been designated a National Natural Landmark. In recent decades, several peregrine falcons have been found there.

Local mountains also include Goodwin 2,936 feet (895 m), Bald 3,316 feet (1,011 m), Hedgehog 2,201 feet (671 m), Haystack 2,713 feet (827 m), and Bartlett 2,047 feet (624 m).

The town has a local weather recording and reporting station.

== Demographics ==
Historical population
Census	Pop.	Note	%±
1810	126		—
1830	132		—
1840	122		−7.6%
1850	152		24.6%
1860	324		113.2%
1870	412		27.2%
1880	480		16.5%
1890	395		−17.7%
1900	390		−1.3%
1910	331		−15.1%
1920	287		−13.3%
1930	224		−22.0%
1940	224		0.0%
1950	210		−6.2%
1960	179		−14.8%
1970	195		8.9%
1980	257		31.8%
1990	305		18.7%
2000	306		0.3%
2010	350		14.4%
2020	357		2.0%
U.S. Decennial Census

As of the census of 2000, there were 306 people, 133 households, and 90 families residing in the town. The population density was 8.9 people per square mile (3.4/km^{2}). There were 530 housing units at an average density of 15.4 per square mile (5.9/km^{2}).

There were 133 households, out of which 20.3% had children under the age of 18 living in them, 58.6% were married couples living together, 6.8% had a female householder with no husband present, and 32.3% were non-families. 26.3% of all households were made up of individuals, and 6.8% had someone living alone who was 65 years of age or older. The average household size was 2.30 and the average family size was 2.74.

In the town, the population was spread out, with 16.7% under the age of 18, 7.8% from 18 to 24, 22.5% from 25 to 44, 36.3% from 45 to 64, and 16.7% who were 65 years of age or older. The median age was 46 years. For every 100 females, there were 100.0 males. For every 100 females age 18 and over, there were 112.5 males.

== Economy ==
=== Personal income ===
The median income for a household in the town was $27,375, and the median income for a family was $38,333. Males had a median income of $26,875 versus $18,958 for females. The per capita income for the town was $14,522. About 7.8% of families and 14.6% of the population were below the poverty line, including 25.8% of those under the age of eighteen and 3.8% of those 65 or over.

=== Tourism ===
The town is first in the county with the highest percentage of second home ownership. The county is tied for first in the state.

Most of the tourism is around the lake and mountains, which have hiking and biking trails, some of which are associated with the Kingdom Trails, and campgrounds.

== Government ==
=== School district ===
High school students are sent to Lake Region Union High School. The town pays an assessment for this and elects a board member to the Orleans Central Supervisory Union.

== Notable people ==
- Galen Hunter (1802–1872), pharmacist
