= Essex (Vermont Senate district) =

Coordinates: 44.70°N 73.32°W

The Essex district is one of 16 districts of the Vermont Senate. The current district plan is included in the redistricting and reapportionment plan developed by the Vermont General Assembly following the 2020 U.S. census, which applies to legislatures elected in 2022, 2024, 2026, 2028, and 2030.

The Essex district includes all of Essex County, the Towns of Kirby and Lyndon from Caledonia County, and the Towns of Derby, Holland, and Morgan as well as the City of Newport from Orleans County.

== District senators ==
As of 2023

- Russ Ingalls, Republican

== Towns, city, and gores in the Essex district ==
=== Caledonia County ===
- Kirby
- Lyndon

=== Essex County ===
- Averill
- Averys Gore
- Bloomfield
- Brighton
- Canaan
- Concord
- East Haven
- Ferdinand
- Granby
- Guildhall
- Lemington
- Lewis
- Lunenburg
- Maidstone
- Norton
- Victory
- Warner's Grant
- Warren's Gore

=== Orleans County ===
- Derby
- Holland
- Morgan
- Newport (city)

== See also ==
- Essex-Orleans (Vermont Senate district)
- Vermont Senate
