= Essex-Orleans (Vermont Senate district) =

The Essex-Orleans district was one of 13 Vermont Senate districts included in the redistricting and reapportionment plan developed by the Vermont General Assembly following the 2010 U.S. census. The plan applies to legislatures elected in 2012, 2014, 2016, 2018, and 2020. Following the 2020 U.S. census the district was divided into two for Essex County and Orleans County.

The Essex-Orleans district includes all of Essex County, Orleans County, and some parts of others.

As of the 2010 census, the state as a whole had a population of 625,741. As there are a total of 30 senators, there were 20,858 residents per senator.

As of the 2000 census, the state as a whole had a population of 608,827. As there are a total of 30 senators, there were 20,294 residents per senator. The Essex-Orleans district had a population of 38,657 in that same census. The district is apportioned two senators. This equals 19,329 residents per senator, 4.76% below the state average.

== District senators ==
As of 2020:

- Russ Ingalls, Republican
- Robert A. Starr, Democrat

== Towns and cities in the Essex-Orleans district, 2002–2012 elections ==
=== Essex County ===
- Averill
- Averys Gore
- Bloomfield
- Brighton
- Brunswick
- Canaan
- Concord
- East Haven
- Ferdinand
- Granby
- Guildhall
- Lemington
- Lewis
- Lunenburg
- Maidstone
- Norton
- Victory
- Warners Grant
- Warren Gore

=== Franklin County ===
- Montgomery
- Richford

=== Lamoille County ===
- Eden
- Wolcott

=== Orleans County ===
- Albany
- Barton
- Brownington
- Charleston
- Coventry
- Craftsbury
- Derby
- Glover
- Greensboro
- Holland
- Irasburg
- Jay
- Lowell
- Morgan
- Newport
- Newport Town
- Troy
- Westfield
- Westmore
