= Berlin micropolitan area, New Hampshire =

Socioeconomic statistical area in New Hampshire, United States

Coordinates: 44°30′N 71°10′W

The Berlin Micropolitan Statistical Area is the core-based statistical area centered on the urban cluster associated with the city Berlin, New Hampshire, in the United States. As defined by the Office of Management and Budget using counties as building blocks, the area consists of two counties – Coös County in New Hampshire, which contains the city of Berlin, and the adjacent Essex County in Vermont.

An alternative definition using towns as building blocks is the Berlin Micropolitan NECTA. In addition to the city of Berlin, the NECTA consists of the towns of Dummer, Gorham, Milan, Randolph, Shelburne, Stark, and Success.

As of the 2000 census, the micropolitan area had a population of 39,570 (though a July 1, 2009 estimate placed the population at 37,881). As of the 2000 census, the NECTA had a population of 16,102.

== Counties ==
- Coös County, New Hampshire
- Essex County, Vermont

== Communities ==
=== Coos County ===
- Cities
  - Berlin (Principal city)

- Towns
  - Carroll
  - Clarksville
  - Colebrook
  - Columbia
  - Dalton
  - Dummer
  - Errol
  - Gorham
  - Jefferson
  - Lancaster
  - Milan
  - Northumberland
  - Pittsburg
  - Randolph
  - Shelburne
  - Stark
  - Stewartstown
  - Stratford
  - Whitefield

- Locations*
  - Erving's
  - Martin's
  - Wentworth
- Grants*
  - Atkinson & Gilmanton Academy
  - Bean's
  - Cutt's
  - Dix's
  - Green's
  - Low and Burbank's
  - Pinkham's
  - Second College
- Purchases*
  - Bean's
  - Chandler's
  - Crawford's
  - Hadley's
  - Sargent's
  - Thompson and Meserve's
- Townships*
  - Cambridge
  - Dixville
  - Kilkenny
  - Millsfield
  - Odell
  - Success
- Villages*
  - Dixville Notch
- Census-designated places
  - Groveton

* In New Hampshire, locations, grants, townships (which are different from towns), and purchases are unincorporated portions of a county which are not part of any town and have limited self-government (if any, as many are uninhabited). Villages are census divisions of towns or cities, but have no separate corporate existence from the municipality they are located in.

=== Essex County ===
- Towns
  - Averill (unorganized)
  - Bloomfield
  - Brighton
  - Brunswick
  - Canaan
  - Concord
  - East Haven
  - Ferdinand (unorganized)
  - Granby
  - Guildhall
  - Lemington
  - Lewis (unorganized)
  - Lunenburg
  - Maidstone
  - Norton
  - Victory

- Gores*
  - Avery's Gore
  - Warren Gore
- Grants*
  - Warner's Grant
- Census-designated places
  - Island Pond

* In Vermont, gores and grants are unincorporated portions of a county which are not part on any town and have limited self-government (if any, as many are uninhabited). Villages are census divisions of towns or cities, but have no separate corporate existence from the municipality they are located in.

== Demographics ==
As of the census of 2000, there were 39,570 people, 16,563 households, and 10,963 families residing within the micropolitan area. The racial makeup of the area was 97.81% White, 0.13% African American, 0.34% Native American, 0.35% Asian, 0.01% Pacific Islander, 0.17% from other races, and 1.19% from two or more races. Hispanic or Latino of any race were 0.59% of the population.

The median income for a household in the micropolitan area was $32,042, and the median income for a family was $37,819. Males had a median income of $30,041 versus $20,836 for females. The per capita income for the area was $15,803.

== See also ==
- New Hampshire statistical areas
- Vermont statistical areas
