= Silvio O. Conte National Fish and Wildlife Refuge =

Natural conservation area in the northeastern United States

- IUCN category IV (habitat/species management area)
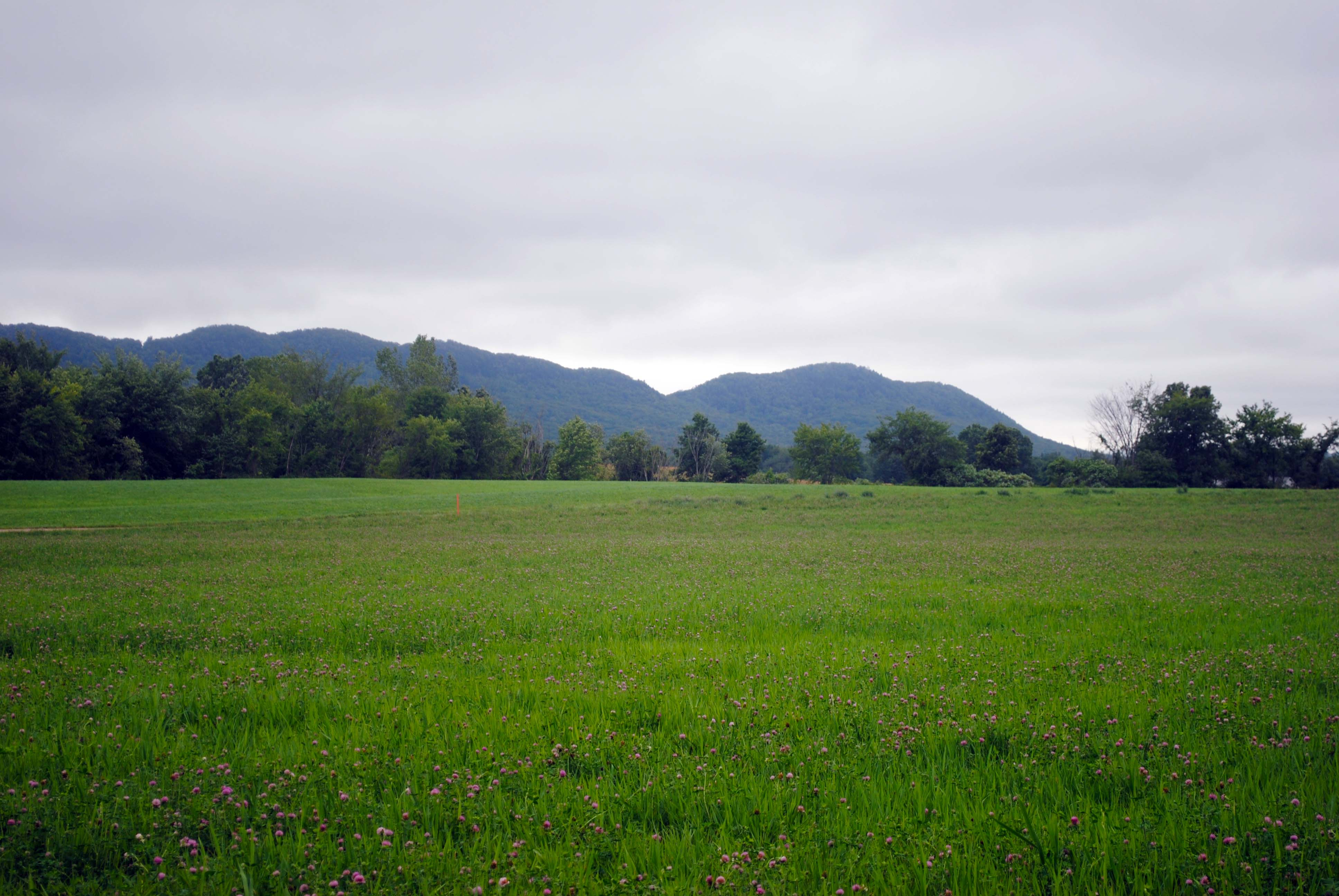
- The Holyoke Range behind a field of clover at the Fort River Division of the Silvio O. Conte National Wildlife Refuge, Hadley, MA

- Location within the United States
- Location: Connecticut, Massachusetts, New Hampshire, Vermont, United States
- Coordinates: 44°46′05″N 71°42′09″W
- Area: 31,216 acres (126.33 km^{2})
- Established: 1997
- Governing body: U.S. Fish and Wildlife Service
- Website: Silvio O. Conte National Fish and Wildlife Refuge

Silvio O. Conte National Fish and Wildlife Refuge was established in 1997 to conserve, protect and enhance the abundance and diversity of native plant, fish and wildlife species and the ecosystems on which they depend throughout the 7,200,000-acre (29,000 km^{2}) Connecticut River watershed. The watershed covers large areas of Vermont, New Hampshire, Massachusetts and Connecticut. It contains a great diversity of habitats, notably: northern forest valuable as nesting habitat for migrant thrushes, warblers and other birds; rivers and streams used by shad, salmon, herring, the endangered shortnose sturgeon and other migratory fishes; and an internationally significant complex of high-quality tidal fresh, brackish and salt marshes.

The refuge works in partnership with a wide variety of individuals and organizations to provide environmental education, to encourage and support appropriate habitat conservation and management on public and private lands, and to protect additional habitat.

The refuge has three cooperative visitor centers: in Colebrook, New Hampshire; at the Montshire Museum of Science in Norwich, Vermont; and Great Falls Discovery Center in Turners Falls, Massachusetts.

The refuge is named for Silvio O. Conte, a late, longtime member of the United States House of Representatives for Massachusetts who worked to preserve and protect the environment.

== Areas ==
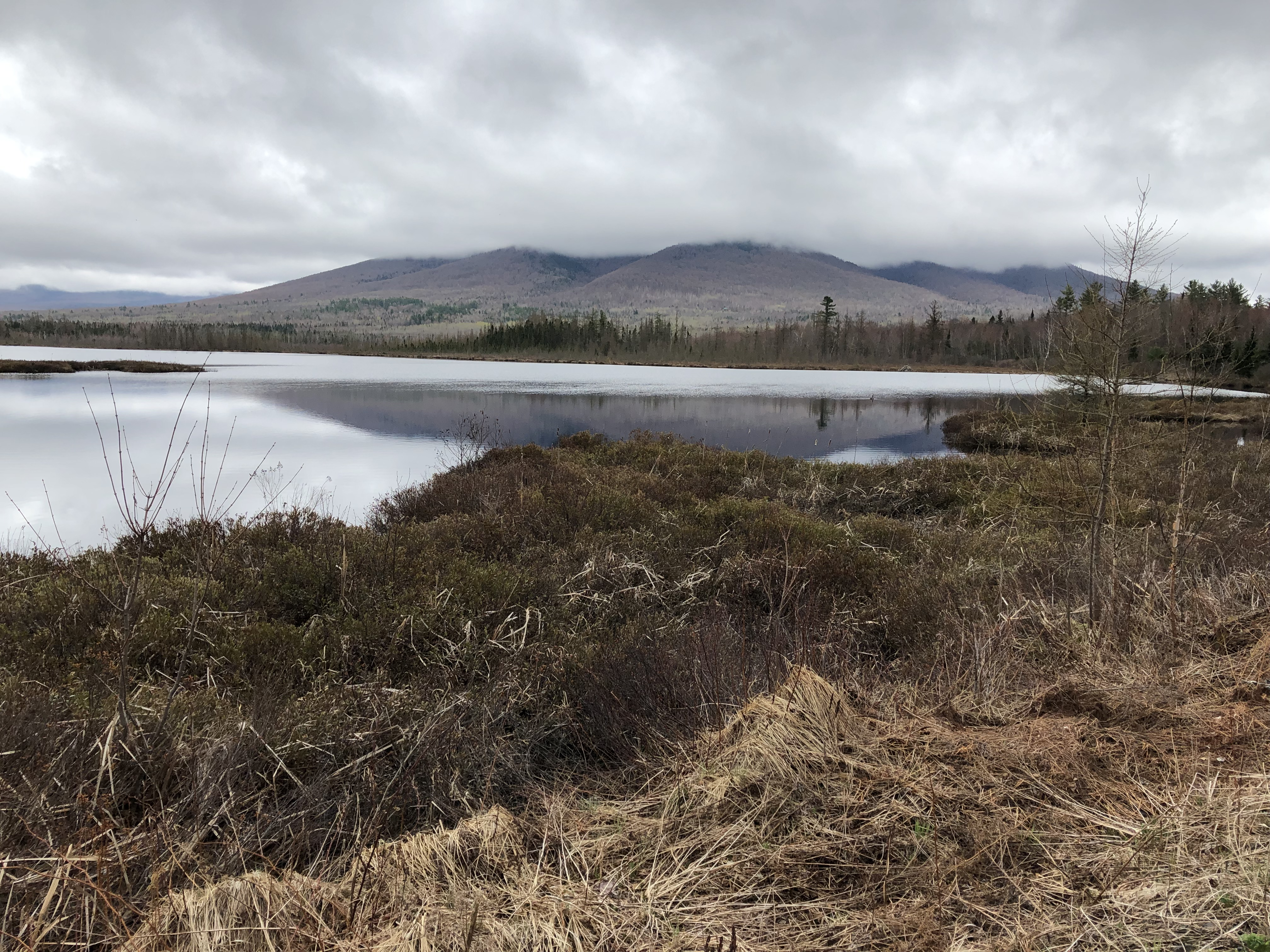
Pondicherry Division in New Hampshire

The refuge currently consists of nine units (small tracts) and eight divisions (large tracts):

=== Connecticut ===
- Deadman's Swamp Unit - 33 acres (13 ha) of wetlands and a riverine sand spit that hosts a federally listed beetle in Cromwell, Connecticut, closed to the public for resource protection.
- Roger Tory Peterson Unit - Old Lyme, Connecticut, was once part of the estate of author and naturalist Roger Tory Peterson.
- Salmon River Division - 425 acres (172 ha) located in the lower Connecticut River valley at the confluence of the Salmon River and the Connecticut River in Haddam, Connecticut.

=== Massachusetts ===
- Third Island Unit - a 4-acre (1.6 ha) island in Deerfield, Massachusetts.
- Honey Pot Unit - a 21-acre (8.5 ha) upland and wetland parcel in Westfield, Massachusetts.
- Wissatinnewag Unit - 21-acre (8.5 ha) on the river opposite the Great Falls Discovery Center in Turners Falls, Massachusetts.
- Mount Tom Unit - 141 acres (57 ha) on Mount Tom in Holyoke, Massachusetts.
- Mount Toby Unit - 30 acres (12 ha) at the base of Mount Toby in Sunderland, Massachusetts.
- Fort River Division - 260 acres (110 ha) located in Hadley, Massachusetts.
- Mill River Division - 249 acres (101 ha) located in Northampton, Massachusetts.
- Westfield River Division - 125 acres (51 ha) on Benton Hill Road in Becket, Massachusetts.
- Hatfield Unit - 19 acres (7.7 ha) in Hatfield, Massachusetts.
- Dead Branch Division - 98 acres (40 ha) in Chesterfield, Massachusetts.
- Fannie Stebbins Unit - 371 acres (150 ha) in Longmeadow, Massachusetts, named for Fannie Stebbins

=== New Hampshire ===
- Pondicherry Division - 6,405 acres (2,592 ha) in Jefferson, Whitefield, and Carroll, New Hampshire
- Blueberry Swamp Division - 1,023 acres (414 ha) on the Mohawk River in Columbia, New Hampshire

=== Vermont ===
- Nulhegan Basin Division - over 26,000 acres (11,000 ha) in Brunswick, Ferdinand, Bloomfield and Lewis, with the division headquarters and visitor contact station located in Brunswick.
- Putney Mountain Unit - 285 acres (115 ha) which host a federally endangered plant, northeastern bulrush, in Putney and Brookline, Vermont.
