= Guildhall Village Historic District =

Historic district in Vermont, United States

- U.S. National Register of Historic Places
- U.S. Historic district
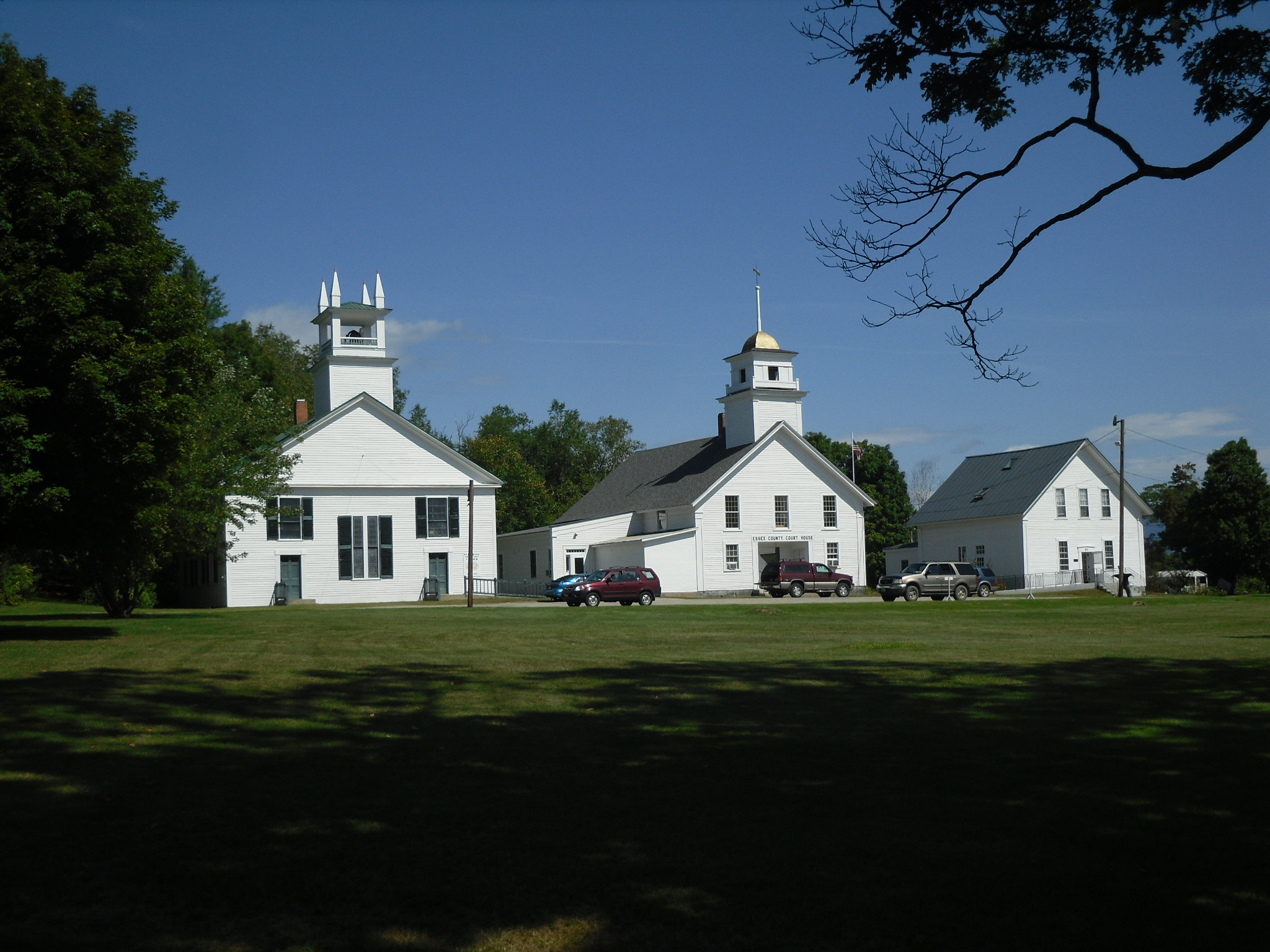

- Location within Vermont Location within the United States
- Location: VT 102, Guildhall, Vermont
- Coordinates: 44°33′56″N 71°33′46″W
- Area: 39 acres (16 ha)
- Architectural style: Greek Revival
- NRHP reference No.: 80000331
- Added to NRHP: September 27, 1980

The Guildhall Village Historic District encompasses the central common and surrounding buildings in the village center of Guildhall, Vermont. The town, the first to be settled in Vermont's Northeast Kingdom, has a history from the late 18th century as a commercial, civic, and industrial center, and is the shire town of Essex County. The district was listed on the National Register of Historic Places in 1980.

== Description and history ==
The area that is now Guildhall village was first settled in the 1780s, when a dam was built across the adjacent Connecticut River, and saw- and gristmills were erected. Eben Judd, proprietor of the mills in 1797, donated land for the common in that year to secure the town's role as the seat of the newly established Essex County. The town is named for the Guild Hall, part of which was built in 1792 and is the oldest commercial structure in the county. The first county courthouse was built in 1803, followed by other civic, commercial, religious and residential buildings that now line the roughly square common.

Guildhall village is located in the northeastern corner of the town, on the western bank of the Connecticut River. The historic district is centered on the square common at the center of Guildhall village, former by a bend in Vermont Route 102, which runs west toward Lunenburg and north toward Maidstone. The common is bounded on the north and west by Courthouse Drive. The district includes all of the buildings facing the common, and extends for a short distance along VT 102 both north and west. It is bounded on the east and south by the river, and includes the remains of two industrial sites on the river bank: a former hydroelectric plant built in 1921 and destroyed by fire in 1963 at the western end of the Northumberland Dam, and the remains of the 1787 Ward Bailey Gristmill. Prominent buildings in the district include the 1851 Greek Revival county courthouse, the 1844 Congregational church, and the former jail, jailer's house, and barn, all built c. 1880.

== See also ==
- National Register of Historic Places listings in Essex County, Vermont
