= Averill, Vermont =

Coordinates: 44°56′22″N 71°39′59″W

- Town
- Location in Essex County and the state of Vermont.
- Country: United States
- State: Vermont
- County: Essex County

Government
  - Type: Unincorporated town

Area
  - Total: 38.1 sq mi (98.6 km^{2})
  - Land: 36.0 sq mi (93.3 km^{2})
  - Water: 2.0 sq mi (5.3 km^{2})
- Elevation: 2,100 ft (640 m)

Population (2020)
  - Total: 21
  - Density: 0.52/sq mi (0.2/km^{2})
- Time zone: UTC-5 (EST)
  - Summer (DST): UTC-4 (EDT)
- ZIP codes: 05901 (Averill); 05907 (Norton)
- FIPS code: 50-009-02125
- GNIS feature ID: 1462029

Averill is an unincorporated town in Essex County, Vermont, United States. The town was named for Samuel Averill, a landholder. The town was never formally incorporated, having never gained a large enough permanent population. The population was 21 at the 2020 census. The town's affairs are handled by the Unified Towns & Gores of Essex County. It is part of the Berlin, New Hampshire Vermont Micropolitan Statistical Area.

== History ==
Averill was originally chartered in 1762 as part of the Province of New Hampshire on the behalf of Royal Governor Benning Wentworth. Averill consisted of twenty three thousand and forty acres of land, which was divided among seventy equal shares, with the stipulation that the grantees must cultivate a tenth of their land within five years, and that all pine trees fit for ship masts must be preserved for that purpose. The first settlers arrived in the 1830s, and in 1840 the town had 11 residents. In the 1870s a sawmill was built in the neighboring town of Norton, which led to a rise in population to 48 residents in 1880. The Averill Lumber Co. formed in the 1880s, and operated a mill on the east side of Great Averill Lake until it burned down in 1898.

== Geography ==
Averill is in northern Essex County, bordered by Canaan to the northeast, Lemington to the southeast, Bloomfield at the southernmost point, Lewis on the southwest, Averys Gore to the west, and Norton to the northwest. The northern corner of Averill is less than 0.5 miles (0.8 km) south of the Canada–US border.

Vermont Route 114 crosses the northern tip of the town, leading east 8 miles (13 km) to Canaan village and west 5 miles (8 km) to Norton. According to the United States Census Bureau, the town has a total area of 38.1 square miles (98.6 km^{2}), of which 36.0 square miles (93.3 km^{2}) is land and 2.0 square miles (5.3 km^{2}), or 5.40%, is water. The town includes Great Averill Pond, Little Averill Pond, and Forest Lake. The highest point in the town is an unnamed 2,970-foot (910 m) summit along the border with Lemington in the southeast.

Averill contains two lakes—Big Averill Lake (sometimes notated on maps as Great Averill pond) and Little Averill Lake. Big Averill is a rectangular lake about 2 miles long and 0.7 miles wide. One side of the lake (Cottage Road) is outfitted with electrical power, and the backside (Jackson Road) is not wired for electricity. Little Averill lies 1,000 yards to the southwest of Big Averill.

=== Climate ===
The Averill weather station is near the northern edge of Great Averill Pond, just south of the border with Canada. Averill has a humid continental climate(Köppen Dfb), with subarctic climate (Köppen Dfc) influences. Its far northern location and relatively high elevation of 1,699 ft (518 m), means it has some of the coldest weather in Vermont. The daily average temperature stays below freezing for five months, with high levels of snowfall as well. The climate is very similar to the nearby places Island Pond and First Connecticut Lake.

This weather box uses the temperature and precipitation normals for Averill.

Climate data for Averill, Vermont, 1991–2020 normals, 2011–2023 extremes: 1699ft (518m)
Month	Jan	Feb	Mar	Apr	May	Jun	Jul	Aug	Sep	Oct	Nov	Dec	Year
Record high °F (°C)	51 (11)	64 (18)	76 (24)	80 (27)	92 (33)	89 (32)	90 (32)	87 (31)	88 (31)	83 (28)	70 (21)	59 (15)	92 (33)
Mean maximum °F (°C)	43.5 (6.4)	46.8 (8.2)	54.3 (12.4)	68.4 (20.2)	83.3 (28.5)	85.3 (29.6)	86.6 (30.3)	83.9 (28.8)	81.9 (27.7)	73.0 (22.8)	61.7 (16.5)	49.0 (9.4)	85.9 (29.9)
Mean daily maximum °F (°C)	21.5 (−5.8)	24.9 (−3.9)	34.0 (1.1)	47.2 (8.4)	62.2 (16.8)	70.3 (21.3)	75.5 (24.2)	73.9 (23.3)	66.4 (19.1)	53.4 (11.9)	39.6 (4.2)	28.2 (−2.1)	49.8 (9.9)
Daily mean °F (°C)	10.9 (−11.7)	13.6 (−10.2)	22.8 (−5.1)	36.9 (2.7)	50.7 (10.4)	59.3 (15.2)	64.4 (18.0)	62.6 (17.0)	55.1 (12.8)	43.1 (6.2)	31.1 (−0.5)	19.4 (−7.0)	39.2 (4.0)
Mean daily minimum °F (°C)	0.2 (−17.7)	2.2 (−16.6)	11.5 (−11.4)	26.6 (−3.0)	39.1 (3.9)	48.3 (9.1)	53.2 (11.8)	51.2 (10.7)	43.7 (6.5)	32.7 (0.4)	22.6 (−5.2)	10.6 (−11.9)	28.5 (−1.9)
Mean minimum °F (°C)	−20.3 (−29.1)	−21.0 (−29.4)	−13.3 (−25.2)	10.0 (−12.2)	24.6 (−4.1)	32.3 (0.2)	39.3 (4.1)	38.3 (3.5)	28.5 (−1.9)	19.5 (−6.9)	−0.3 (−17.9)	−12.6 (−24.8)	−25.1 (−31.7)
Record low °F (°C)	−30 (−34)	−32 (−36)	−25 (−32)	1 (−17)	21 (−6)	28 (−2)	35 (2)	35 (2)	23 (−5)	11 (−12)	−10 (−23)	−29 (−34)	−32 (−36)
Average precipitation inches (mm)	2.57 (65)	2.51 (64)	3.31 (84)	2.93 (74)	4.00 (102)	4.65 (118)	4.12 (105)	4.33 (110)	3.75 (95)	4.46 (113)	3.26 (83)	2.89 (73)	42.78 (1,086)
Average snowfall inches (cm)	33.5 (85)	34.0 (86)	29.2 (74)	10.9 (28)	2.0 (5.1)	0.0 (0.0)	0.0 (0.0)	0.0 (0.0)	0.0 (0.0)	2.3 (5.8)	20.8 (53)	32.1 (82)	164.8 (418.9)
Source 1: NOAA
Source 2: XMACIS (extremes & 2012-2020 snowfall)

== Government ==
Averill, along with the unorganized towns of Lewis and Ferdinand, as well as the unincorporated areas of Avery's Gore, Warren's Gore, and Warner's Grant, had no local governance. In 2000, a representative Board of Governors (three members) was elected to replace the former Essex County Supervisor system.

== Demographics ==
Historical population
Census	Pop.	Note	%±
1830	1		—
1840	11		1,000.0%
1850	7		−36.4%
1860	12		71.4%
1870	14		16.7%
1880	48		242.9%
1890	43		−10.4%
1900	18		−58.1%
1910	15		−16.7%
1920	4		−73.3%
1930	9		125.0%
1940	12		33.3%
1950	20		66.7%
1960	16		−20.0%
1970	8		−50.0%
1980	15		87.5%
1990	7		−53.3%
2000	8		14.3%
2010	24		200.0%
2020	21		−12.5%
U.S. Decennial Census

As of the census of 2000, there were 8 people, 3 households, and 2 families residing in the town. The population density was 0.2 inhabitants per square mile (0.1/km^{2}). There were 192 housing units at an average density of 5.3 per square mile (2.0/km^{2}). The census also indicates that the racial makeup of the town was 100.00% White, and that 11.1% of the population spoke French at home due largely to the town's proximity to the Province of Quebec.

There were 3 households, out of which one had children under the age of 18 living with them, two were married couples living together, and one was a non-family. One household was made up of individuals who were 65 years of age or older. The average household size was 2.67 and the average family size was 3.50.

In the town, the population was spread out, with two people under the age of 18, one from 18 to 24, two from 25 to 44, one from 45 to 64, and two people who were 65 years of age or older. The median age was 42 years. There were three males and five females, out of which two were under the age of 18.

The median income for a household in the town was $27,500, and the median income for a family was $28,750. Males had a median income of $21,250 versus $13,750 for females. The per capita income for the town was $9,876. None of the population or families were below the poverty line.
