= Brighton, Vermont =

- Town
- Brighton, Vermont, from the southeast

- Seal Logo

- Location in Essex County and the state of Vermont.
- Coordinates: 44°48′32″N 71°52′25″W
- Country: United States
- State: Vermont
- County: Essex
- Chartered: 1781
- Settled: 1824
- Organized: 1832
- Community: Island Pond

Government
  - Type: New England town

Area
  - Total: 53.3 sq mi (138.1 km^{2})
  - Land: 51.9 sq mi (134.3 km^{2})
  - Water: 1.5 sq mi (3.8 km^{2})
- Elevation: 1,175 ft (358 m)

Population (2020)
  - Total: 1,157
  - Density: 22/sq mi (8.6/km^{2})
  - Households: 529
  - Families: 356
- Time zone: UTC-5 (EST)
  - Summer (DST): UTC-4 (EDT)
- ZIP code: 05846 (Island Pond)
- Area code: 802
- FIPS code: 50-08725
- GNIS feature ID: 1462052
- Website: brightonvt.org

Brighton is a town in Essex County, Vermont, United States. The population was 1,157 at the 2020 census.

Brighton is part of the Berlin, NH-VT Micropolitan Statistical Area.

== History ==
The town was named "Gilead" in its original grant in 1780. The town was sold to a group consisting primarily of soldiers commanded by Colonel Joseph Nightingale and subsequently named "Random". The town's name was finally changed by the legislature to "Brighton" in 1832.

The Brighton village of Island Pond gets its name from the Abenaki word Menanbawk, which literally means island pond. In 1957, a 67-foot (20 m) white spruce was chosen from the town for display as the Rockefeller Center Christmas Tree.

== Geography ==
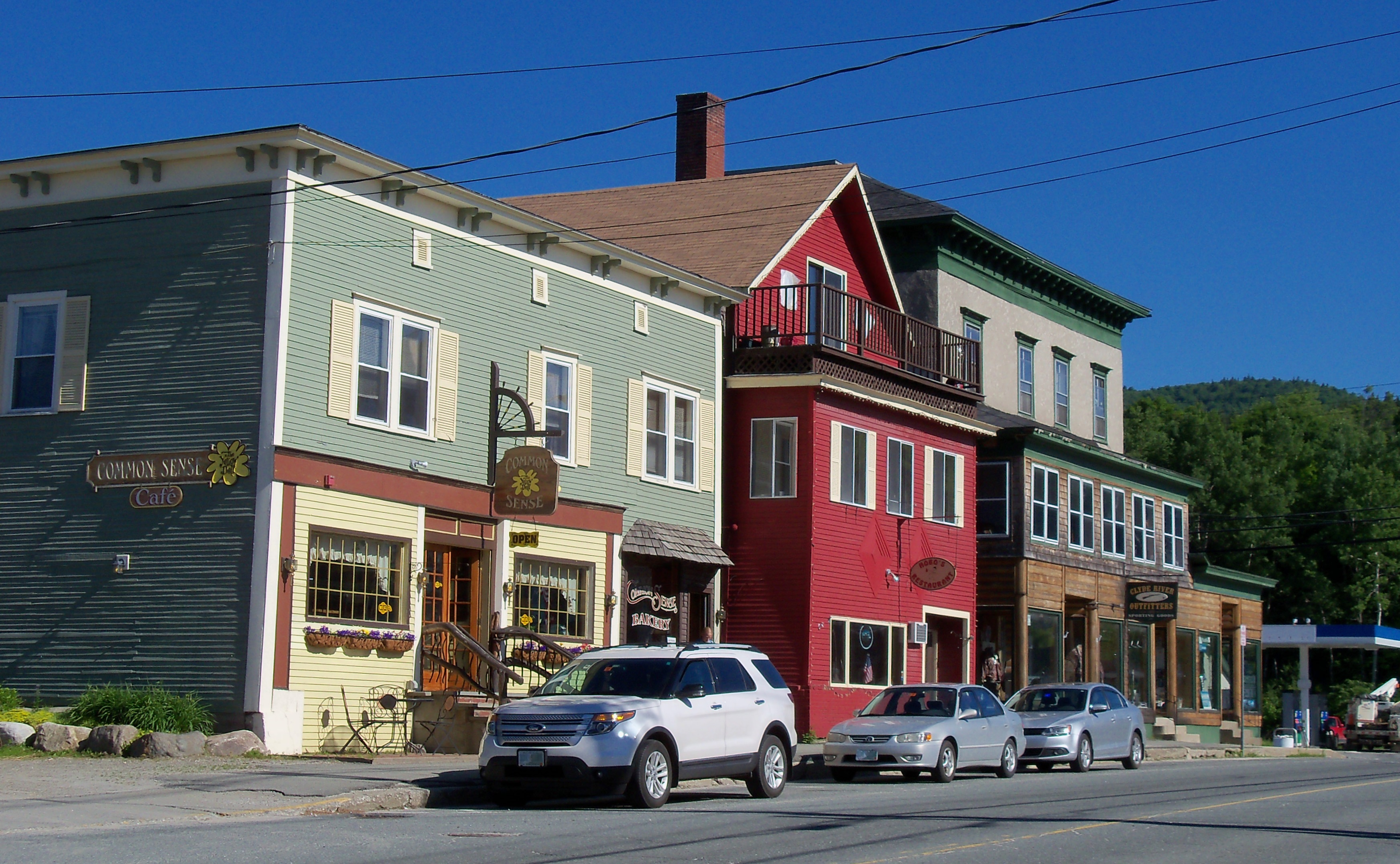
Village of Island Pond in Brighton

Brighton is in western Essex County, bordered to the north by Warren's Gore and Averys Gore, to the northeast by Lewis, to the southeast by Ferdinand, to the southwest by Newark in Caledonia County and Westmore in Orleans County, and to the northwest by Charleston and Morgan in Orleans County. The unincorporated community of Island Pond, the main community in the town, is at the north end of the lake of the same name in the center of the town.

According to the United States Census Bureau, the town of Brighton has a total area of 53.3 square miles (138.1 km^{2}), of which 51.9 square miles (134.3 km^{2}) is land and 1.5 square miles (3.8 km^{2}), or 2.76%, is water. Island Pond, originally called "Knowlton Pond" in the 19th century to honor Luke Knowlton, who surveyed and laid out the town, is Brighton's largest body of water. The Clyde River flows out of the north end of Island Pond and proceeds in a northwesterly direction towards Charleston. Spectacle Pond is a kettle lake just east (upstream) of Island Pond. It is only 8 to 10 feet (2.4 to 3.0 m) deep, with a thick bottom of muck. Most of the town, including Island and Spectacle ponds and the Clyde River, is part of the Lake Memphremagog watershed, and thus part of the Saint Lawrence River basin, via the Magog and Saint-François rivers of Quebec. The east side of the town drains to the Connecticut River, mostly to the east via the Nulhegan River, but a small portion to the south via the East Branch of the Passumpsic River. The highest point in Brighton is the 2,789-foot (850 m) southern summit of Bluff Mountain, in the northern part of the town.

Vermont Routes 114 and 105 cross the town, joining as Derby Street through Island Pond. Route 114 leads north 16 miles (26 km) to the Canada–United States border at Norton, Vermont, and south 24 miles (39 km) to Lyndonville. Route 105 leads east 16 miles (26 km) to Bloomfield on the Connecticut River and northwest 17 miles (27 km) through Charleston to Derby Center.

== Demographics ==
Historical population
Census	Pop.	Note	%±
1810	144		—
1830	105		—
1840	157		49.5%
1850	193		22.9%
1860	945		389.6%
1870	1,535		62.4%
1880	1,691		10.2%
1890	2,020		19.5%
1900	2,023		0.1%
1910	2,013		−0.5%
1920	2,280		13.3%
1930	2,002		−12.2%
1940	1,754		−12.4%
1950	1,671		−4.7%
1960	1,545		−7.5%
1970	1,365		−11.7%
1980	1,557		14.1%
1990	1,562		0.3%
2000	1,260		−19.3%
2010	1,222		−3.0%
2020	1,157		−5.3%
U.S. Decennial Census

The racial make up is 95.4% White, 1.2% Asian and 3.1% from two or more races. As of the census of 2000, there were 1,260 people, 529 households, and 356 families residing in the town. The population density was 24.1 inhabitants per square mile (9.3/km^{2}). There were 891 housing units at an average density of 17.1 per square mile (6.6/km^{2}).

There were 529 households, out of which 30.2% had children under the age of 18 living with them, 51.8% were couples living together and joined in either marriage or civil union, 11.7% had a female householder with no husband present, and 32.7% were non-families. 27.6% of all households were made up of individuals, and 15.5% had someone living alone who was 65 years of age or older. The average household size was 2.38 and the average family size was 2.88.

In the town, the population was spread out, with 25.0% under the age of 18, 7.8% from 18 to 24, 23.8% from 25 to 44, 25.2% from 45 to 64, and 18.2% who were 65 years of age or older. The median age was 41 years. For every 100 females, there were 94.7 males. For every 100 females age 18 and over, there were 91.3 males.

== Economy ==
=== Personal income ===
The median income for a household in the town was $26,932, and the median income for a family was $31,316. Males had a median income of $26,413 versus $23,125 for females. The per capita income for the town was $12,999. About 14.9% of families and 19.2% of the population were below the poverty line, including 28.7% of those under age 18 and 15.3% of those age 65 or over.

=== Industry ===
==== Tourism ====
The Brighton Snowmobile Club maintains 130 miles (210 km) of trails during the winter.

== Media ==
WVTI 106.9 broadcasts from Island Pond.
