= Concord (CDP), Vermont =

Census-designated place in Vermont, United States

Concord, Vermont
- Census-designated place
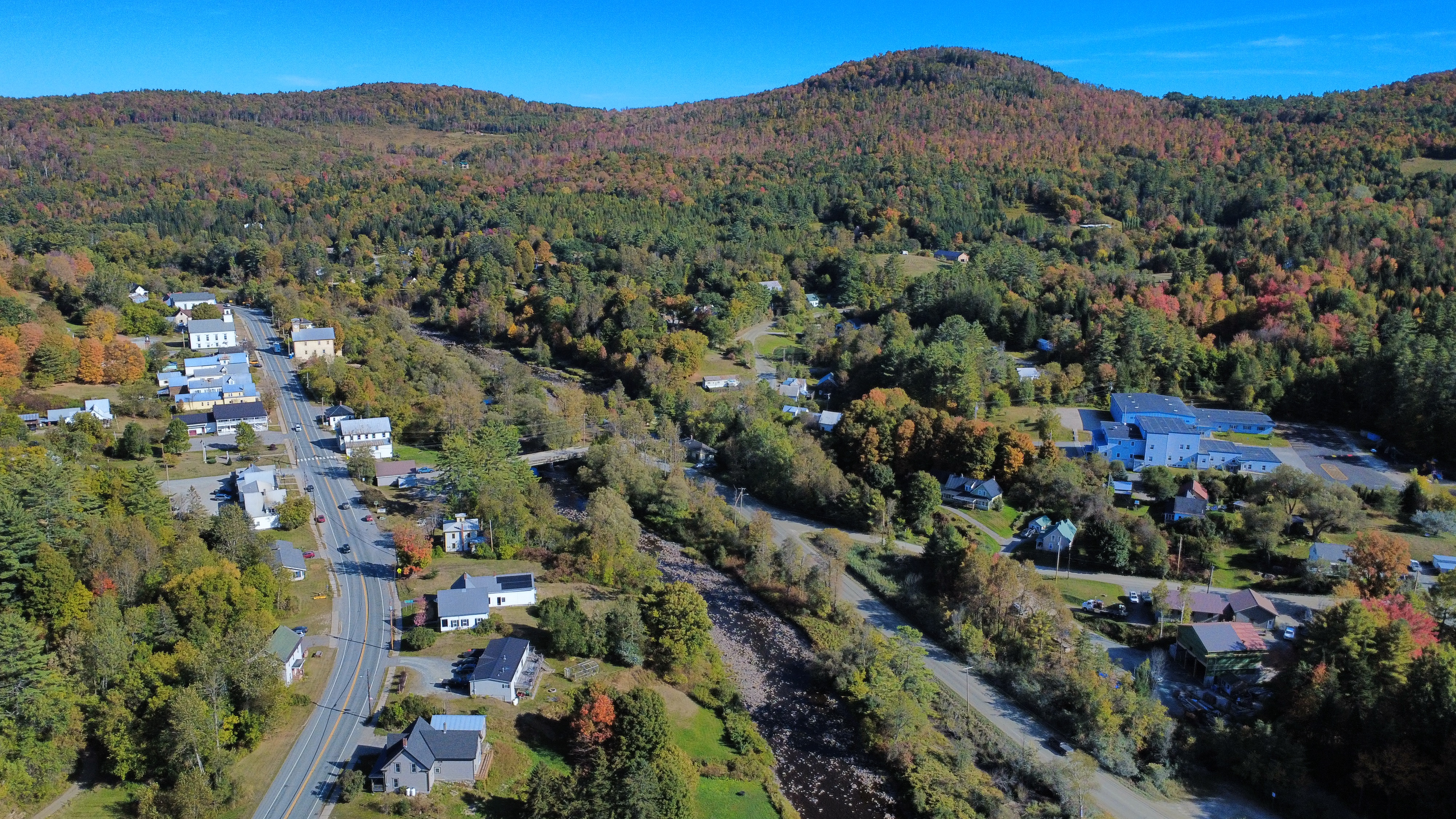
- Concord, VT, from the west

- Location in Essex County and the state of Vermont
- Coordinates: 44°25′44″N 71°52′50″W
- Country: United States
- State: Vermont
- County: Essex
- Town: Concord

Area
  - Total: 1.13 sq mi (2.92 km^{2})
  - Land: 1.10 sq mi (2.85 km^{2})
  - Water: 0.027 sq mi (0.07 km^{2})
- Elevation: 1,017 ft (310 m)

Population (2020)
  - Total: 271
  - Density: 247/sq mi (95.2/km^{2})
- Time zone: UTC-5 (Eastern (EST))
  - Summer (DST): UTC-4 (EDT)
- ZIP code: 05824
- Area code: 802
- GNIS feature ID: 2586624
- FIPS code: 50-15175

Concord is a census-designated place comprising the main settlement in the town of Concord, Essex County, Vermont, United States. As of the 2020 census, it had a population of 213. The Concord CDP is in the western part of the town of Concord, along the Moose River, a west-flowing tributary of the Passumpsic River and part of the Connecticut River basin. U.S. Route 2 passes through the center of the CDP, leading west 8 miles (13 km) to St. Johnsbury and east 20 miles (32 km) to Lancaster, New Hampshire.

The Concord CDP has a total area of 1.1 square miles (2.9 km^{2}), of which 0.027 square miles (0.07 km^{2}), or 2.50%, is water.
