= Janice L. Peaslee =

American politician

Member of the Vermont House of Representatives from the Essex-Caledonia Representative district

Janice L. Peaslee (born 1935) is a Republican politician who served in the Vermont House of Representatives. She represented the Essex-Caledonia Representative District.

== Personal life ==
Peaslee lives in Guildhall, Vermont and is a licensed pilot.

== Political views ==
=== On job creation ===
In early 2010 Peaslee opposed the sale of the John Boylan airport in Island Pond, Vermont to a wood pellet manufacturer that had been looking at the land as a possible site for a new plant. A spokesman for the Vermont Transportation Agency said that the airport only collects $3,300 in revenue and costs $6,100 to operate. Peaslee joined those pilots, mostly from New Hampshire, who opposed to the closure of the airport saying "I know we don't want to destroy an airport."

=== On energy ===
In 2005 Peaslee supported the installation of five wind turbines in Sheffield, Vermont; a town not in here district. While she supported this project she opposes any larger scale installations, saying, "The only thing we have going for us up here is our beauty."

== Legislative record ==
In 2010 Peaslee sponsored a resolution recognizing the importance of general aviation and a bill that would expand the airport hazard area to a ten-mile radius around any airport and that would "Prohibit the construction or alteration of structures of specified heights that lie within airport hazard areas or on military training routes that are found by the Federal Aviation Administration to be an obstruction to air navigation, or that would interfere with specified airport functions."

== Election of 2008 ==
In 2008 Peaslee was challenged by Joshua Bell, an Independent, and Stephanie R. Sterling, a Democrat. Although she failed to receive the majority of votes cast she was reelected.

The Pfizer leadership PAC contributed to Peaslee's campaign but she did not have to list Pfizer as a campaign contributor in her contribution reports to the Vermont's Secretary of State because the PAC did not exceed the amount at which contributors have to legally be named.
