= North Concord, Vermont =

- Village
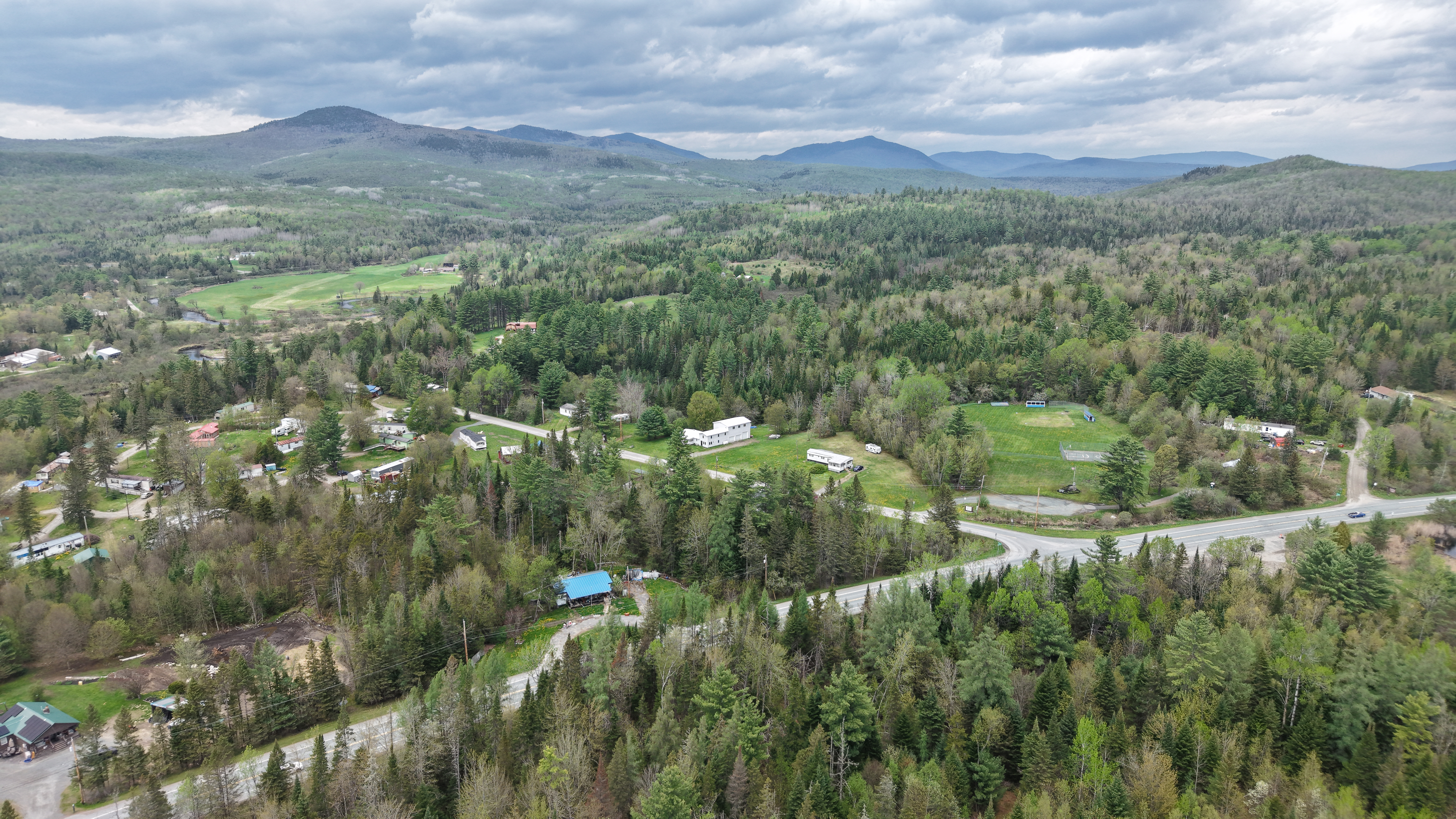
- North Concord, Vermont, from the southwest

- Location within Vermont
- Coordinates: 44°28′06″N 71°51′19″W
- Country: United States
- State: Vermont
- County: Essex
- Elevation: 1,073 ft (327 m)
- Time zone: UTC-5 (Eastern (EST))
  - Summer (DST): UTC-4 (EDT)
- ZIP code: 05858
- Area code: 802
- GNIS feature ID: 1458722

North Concord is an unincorporated village in the town of Concord, Essex County, Vermont, United States. The community is located along U.S. Route 2, 8.6 miles (13.8 km) east-northeast of St. Johnsbury. North Concord has a post office with ZIP code 05858.
