= Brunswick, Vermont =

- Town
- Location in Essex County and the state of Vermont
- Coordinates: 44°44′10″N 71°39′48″W
- Country: United States
- State: Vermont
- County: Essex
- Chartered: 1761
- Settled: 1780

Area
  - Total: 26.0 sq mi (67.3 km^{2})
  - Land: 25.5 sq mi (66.0 km^{2})
  - Water: 0.54 sq mi (1.4 km^{2})
- Elevation: 1,020 ft (310 m)

Population (2020)
  - Total: 88
  - Density: 3.4/sq mi (1.3/km^{2})
  - Households: 40
  - Families: 28
- Time zone: UTC-5 (EST)
  - Summer (DST): UTC-4 (EDT)
- ZIP code: 05905
- Area code: 802
- FIPS code: 50-10075
- GNIS feature ID: 1462057

Brunswick is a town in Essex County, Vermont, United States. The town was named after Prince Karl Wilhelm Ferdinand of Brunswick-Lunenburg. The population was 88 at the 2020 census. It is part of the Berlin, NH-VT Micropolitan Statistical Area. Brunswick is home to six mineral springs that made the town a popular resort destination in the 19th century. The land the springs are on is now owned by the Abenaki people.

== Geography ==
Brunswick is on the eastern side of Essex County, bordering the Connecticut River, which forms the state boundary with New Hampshire. To the south is the town of Maidstone, to the west is Ferdinand, to the northwest is Lewis, and to the north is Bloomfield. To the east, across the Connecticut River, is the town of Stratford, New Hampshire.

According to the United States Census Bureau, the town of Brunswick has a total area of 26.0 square miles (67.3 km^{2}), of which 25.5 square miles (66.0 km^{2}) is land and 0.54 square miles (1.4 km^{2}), or 2.03%, is water.

== Demographics ==
Historical population
Census	Pop.	Note	%±
1790	66		—
1800	86		30.3%
1810	143		66.3%
1820	124		−13.3%
1830	160		29.0%
1840	130		−18.7%
1850	119		−8.5%
1860	212		78.2%
1870	221		4.2%
1880	193		−12.7%
1890	160		−17.1%
1900	166		3.8%
1910	82		−50.6%
1920	89		8.5%
1930	73		−18.0%
1940	86		17.8%
1950	73		−15.1%
1960	62		−15.1%
1970	45		−27.4%
1980	82		82.2%
1990	92		12.2%
2000	107		16.3%
2010	112		4.7%
2020	88		−21.4%
U.S. Decennial Census

At the 2000 census there were 107 people, 40 households, and 28 families in the town. The population density was 4.2 inhabitants per square mile (1.6/km^{2}). There were 89 housing units at an average density of 3.5 per square mile (1.4/km^{2}). The racial makeup of the town was 99.07% White and 0.93% African American. Of the 40 households 40.0% had children under the age of 18 living with them, 65.0% were married couples living together, 2.5% had a female householder with no husband present, and 30.0% were non-families. 20.0% of households were one person and 5.0% were one person aged 65 or older. The average household size was 2.68 and the average family size was 3.25.

The age distribution was 29.9% under the age of 18, 5.6% from 18 to 24, 26.2% from 25 to 44, 29.0% from 45 to 64, and 9.3% 65 or older. The median age was 40 years. For every 100 females, there were 101.9 males. For every 100 females age 18 and over, there were 120.6 males.

The median household income was $21,250 and the median family income was $31,250. Males had a median income of $15,833 versus $15,000 for females. The per capita income for the town was $12,925. There were 23.1% of families and 29.1% of the population living below the poverty line, including 48.3% of under eighteens and none of those over 64.
