= Concord, Vermont =

- Town
- Concord, VT, from the east
- Motto: "Four Seasons Playground"
- Location in Essex County and the state of Vermont
- Coordinates: 44°26′01″N 71°50′05″W
- Country: United States
- State: Vermont
- County: Essex
- Communities: Concord; Concord Corner; East Concord; Miles Pond; North Concord

Area
  - Total: 53.5 sq mi (138.6 km^{2})
  - Land: 51.3 sq mi (132.9 km^{2})
  - Water: 2.2 sq mi (5.7 km^{2})
- Elevation: 1,365 ft (416 m)

Population (2020)
  - Total: 1,141
  - Density: 22/sq mi (8.6/km^{2})
- Time zone: UTC-5 (EST)
  - Summer (DST): UTC-4 (EDT)
- ZIP Codes: 05824 (Concord); 05858 (North Concord); 05906 (Lunenburg)
- Area code: 802
- FIPS code: 50-15250
- GNIS feature ID: 1462074
- Website: www.concordvt.us

Concord is a town in Essex County, Vermont, United States. The population was 1,141 at the 2020 census. It is part of the Berlin, NH –VT Micropolitan Statistical Area.

== History ==
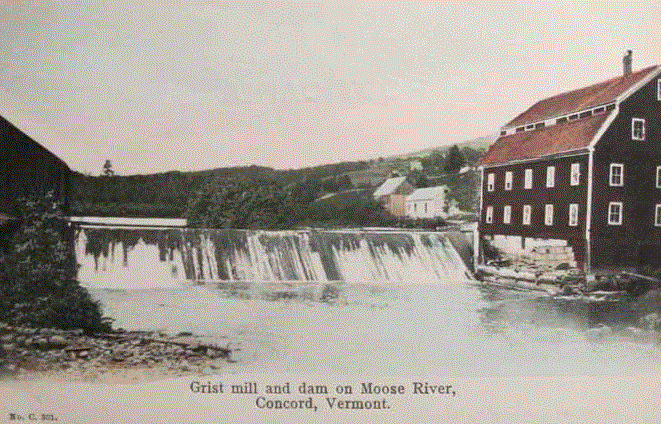
Grist Mill on Moose River, 1906

Concord was chartered on September 15, 1780, to Reuben Jones and others from Rockingham, Vermont. Concord was first settled by Simon Willard, a fur trader, and two other men. It gets its name from Concord, Massachusetts.

== Geography ==
Concord is the southernmost town in Essex County. It is bordered to the west by three towns in Caledonia County: Waterford to the southwest, St. Johnsbury at the westernmost point of Concord, and Kirby to the northwest. The Essex County towns of Victory and Lunenburg are to the north and east, respectively. The southern edge of the town borders the Connecticut River, which forms the state boundary with New Hampshire. To the southeast is the town of Dalton in Coos County, New Hampshire, and to the south is the town of Littleton in Grafton County, New Hampshire. There are no crossings of the Connecticut River from Concord.

The town includes the settlement of Concord in the west, North Concord in the north, Miles Pond in the east, East Concord in the southeast, and Concord Corner in the southwest. U.S. Route 2 crosses the town from east to west, connecting Lancaster, New Hampshire, with St. Johnsbury.

According to the United States Census Bureau, the town has a total area of 53.5 square miles (138.6 km^{2}), of which 51.3 square miles (132.9 km^{2}) is land and 2.2 square miles (5.7 km^{2}), or 4.10%, is water. Much of the water surface is in the Connecticut River impoundment of Moore Reservoir. Miles Pond, in the eastern part of town, is the next largest water body, and Shadow Lake is in the southwest.

== Demographics ==
Historical population
Census	Pop.	Note	%±
1790	49		—
1800	322		557.1%
1810	677		110.2%
1820	806		19.1%
1830	1,031		27.9%
1840	1,024		−0.7%
1850	1,153		12.6%
1860	1,291		12.0%
1870	1,276		−1.2%
1880	1,612		26.3%
1890	1,425		−11.6%
1900	1,129		−20.8%
1910	1,080		−4.3%
1920	1,102		2.0%
1930	1,043		−5.4%
1940	923		−11.5%
1950	979		6.1%
1960	956		−2.3%
1970	896		−6.3%
1980	1,125		25.6%
1990	1,093		−2.8%
2000	1,196		9.4%
2010	1,235		3.3%
2020	1,141		−7.6%
U.S. Decennial Census

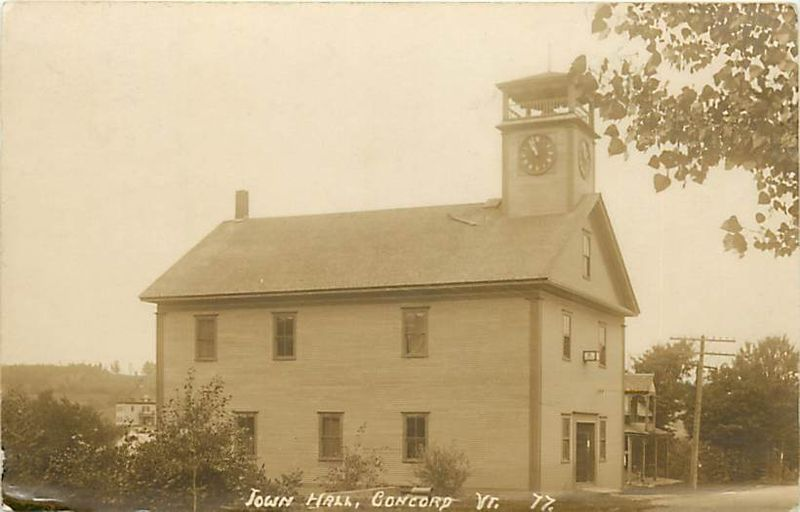
Concord Townhall, 1877

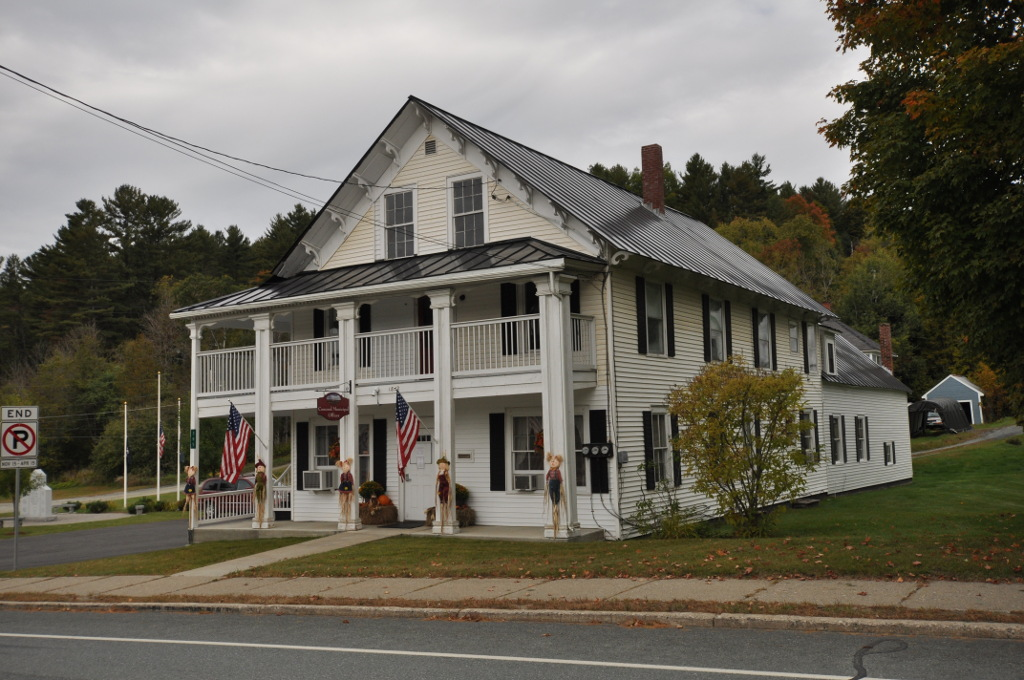
Concord Town Offices, 2016

As of the census of 2000, there were 1,196 people, 467 households, and 318 families living in the town. The population density was 23.3 inhabitants per square mile (9.0/km^{2}). There were 763 housing units at an average density of 14.8 per square mile (5.7/km^{2}). The racial makeup of the town was 97.24% White, 0.25% Asian, 0.92% from other races, and 1.59% from two or more races. There were 467 households, out of which 69% had children under the age of 18 living with them, 54.2% were married couples living together, 7.3% had a female householder with no husband present, and 31.9% were non-families. 22.3% of all households were made up of individuals, and 9.6% had someone living alone who was 65 years of age or older. The average household size was 2.52 and the average family size was 2.93.

In the town, the population was spread out, with 26.3% under the age of 18, 6.4% from 18 to 24, 30.0% from 25 to 44, 24.9% from 45 to 64, and 12.3% who were 65 years of age or older. The median age was 37 years. For every 100 females, there were 97.7 males. For every 100 females age 18 and over, there were 103.0 males.

The median income for a family was $38,264. Males had a median income of $28,322 versus $19,471 for females. The per capita income for the town was $15,173. About 7.5% of families and 11.4% of the population were below the poverty line, including 13.8% of those under age 18 and 13.1% of those age 65 or over.

== Education ==
Concord has run a K–8 school since the high school closed in 2015. Concord was the location of the country's first normal school, founded in 1823 by Samuel Read Hall.

== See also ==
- Concord, Ontario – named associated to settler Hiram White, who was born in Concord, Vermont in 1788 and arrived in Vaughan, Ontario in 1818 and died there in 1859.
