= Gore (surveying) =

Irregular parcel of land

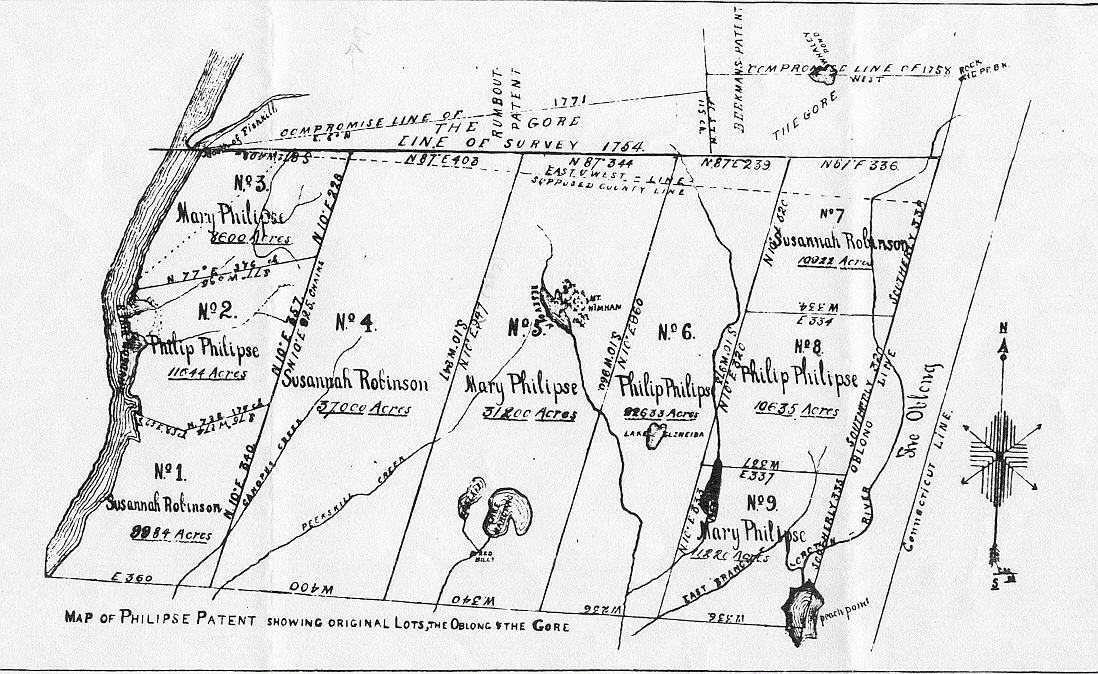
Map of the Philipse Patent (largely today's Putnam County, New York) showing three gores resulting from conflicting surveys.

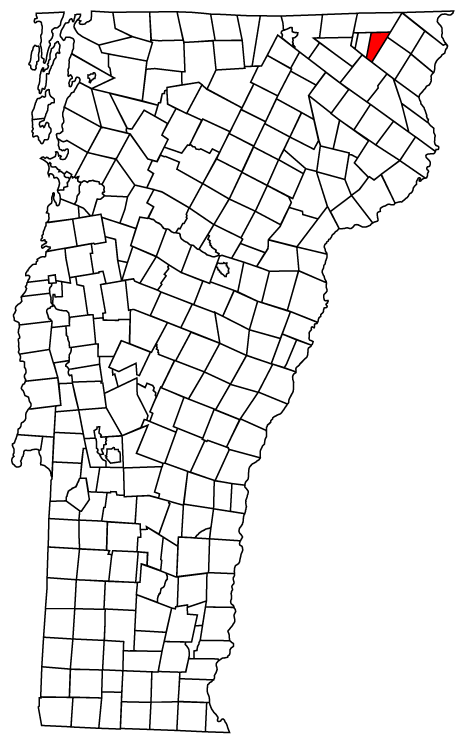
Averys Gore, Vermont. The two smaller divisions to the left are Warren's Gore and Warner's Grant.

A gore is an irregular parcel of land, created as a result of surveying errors during land grants.

In modern surveying, a gore is a strip of land that might be left between surveys that do not close. In some areas of New England, a gore (sometimes called a grant) is an unincorporated area that is not part of any town and has limited self-government.

== History ==
Historically, North American named gores were most often either the result of errors from when the land was first surveyed, or Colonial era land patents. A gore would be created by conflicting surveys, resulting in two or more patentees claiming the same land, or lie in an area between two supposedly abutting towns but technically in neither. Surrounding towns have been known to absorb a gore—for example, the gore between Tunbridge and Royalton, Vermont, was eventually incorporated into Tunbridge. Some gores have become towns in their own right, such as Stannard, Vermont.

=== As unincorporated territories ===
Different states have different laws governing gores and other unincorporated territories. In Maine, all unincorporated territories (whether townships, gores, or grants) are governed directly by the Land Use Planning Commission, a state agency. They do not, therefore, enjoy the rights and obligations of direct local self-governance of a corporate Maine municipality, via local elections of town boards of selectmen, and town meetings that debate and approve the town budget and expenditures. Occasionally, a town will choose to become unincorporated after having been an incorporated town; a recent example of this is the former town of Madrid, Maine.

==== Sample New England gores ====
Some of New England's gores include:

Gore	County	2020 Population	Area in km^{2} (mi^{2})
Averys Gore, Vermont	Essex County, Vermont	0	45.6 (17.6)
Buels Gore, Vermont	Chittenden County, Vermont	29	13.1 (5.1)
Warner's Grant, Vermont	Essex County, Vermont	0	8.2 (3.2)
Warren's Gore, Vermont	Essex County, Vermont	2	30.0 (11.6)
Hibberts Gore, Maine	Lincoln County, Maine	1	2.0 (0.77)

== See also ==
- Gaps and gores
- Gore (segment)
- Land surveying
