= Essex County, Vermont =

County in Vermont, United States

- County
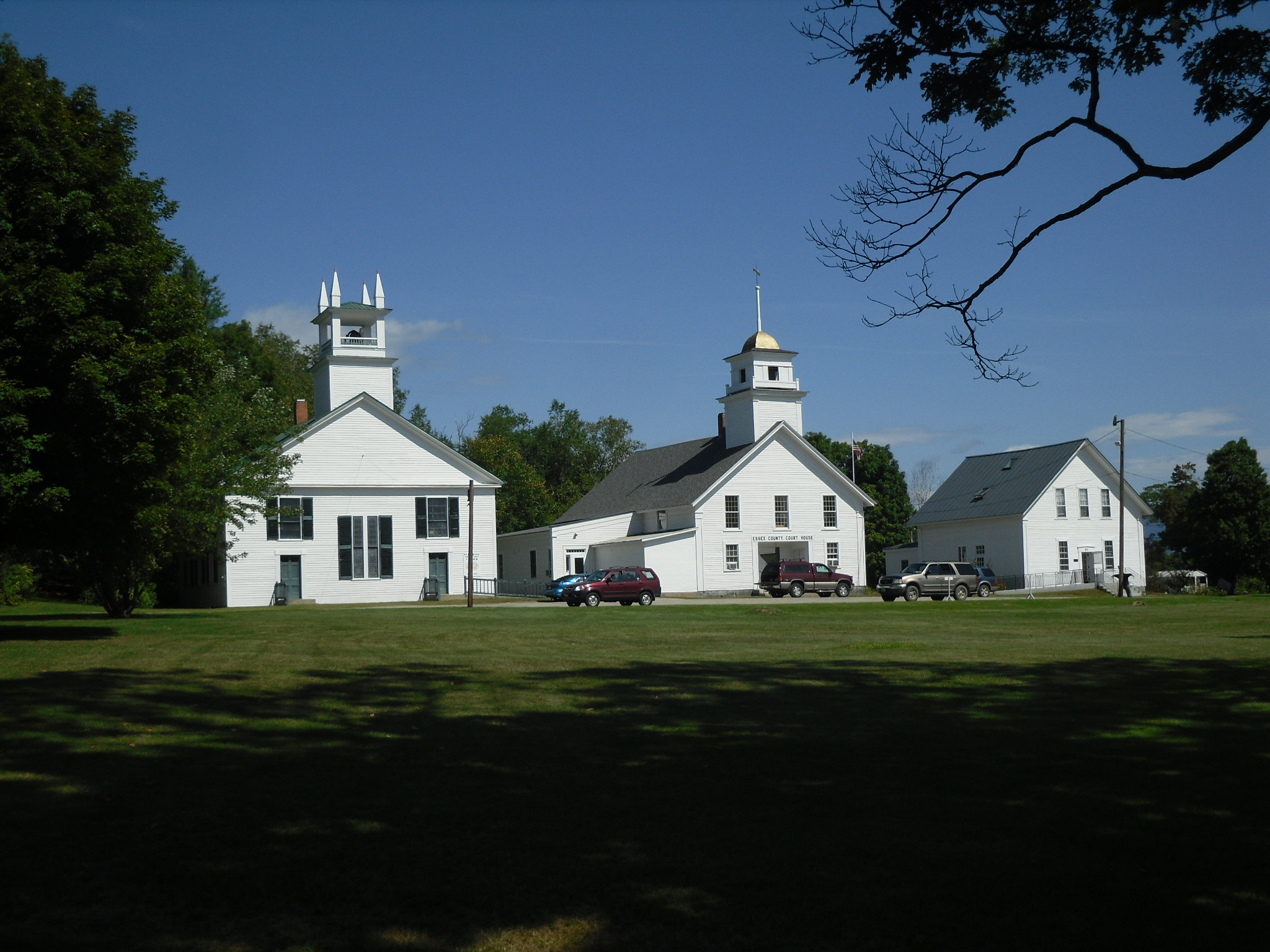
- Essex County Courthouse in Guildhall

- Location within the U.S. state of Vermont
- Coordinates: 44°43′15″N 71°44′42″W
- Country: United States
- State: Vermont
- Founded: 1800
- Named for: Essex
- Shire Town: Guildhall
- Largest town: Lunenburg

Area
  - Total: 675 sq mi (1,750 km^{2})
  - Land: 664 sq mi (1,720 km^{2})
  - Water: 12 sq mi (31 km^{2}) 1.7%

Population (2020)
  - Total: 5,920
  - Estimate (2025): 6,051 ▲
  - Density: 8.92/sq mi (3.44/km^{2})
- Time zone: UTC−5 (Eastern)
  - Summer (DST): UTC−4 (EDT)
- Congressional district: At-large
- Website: https://essexcountyvermont.gov/

Essex County is a county located in the northeastern part of the U.S. state of Vermont. As of the 2020 census, the population was 5,920, making it the least-populous county in both Vermont and New England. Its shire town (county seat) is Guildhall. The county was created in 1792 and organized in 1800. Bordered by the Connecticut River next to New Hampshire, Essex County is south of the Canadian province of Quebec. It is the county with the lowest household-income in Vermont.

== History ==
Prior to the arrival of colonists of European descent, the area was populated by the Abenakis. They used the Connecticut and Nulhegan rivers as primary means of travel through the area along with many subsidiary rivers and streams. The culture was mostly hunter-gatherer with a combination of agriculture, hunting and fishing. While the rivers provided good fishing, the primary food animal was moose.

Vermont was divided into two counties in March 1778. In 1781 the legislature divided the northernmost county, Cumberland, into three counties: Windham and Windsor, in approximately the modern location for those counties. The northern remainder was called Orange County. This latter tract nearly corresponded with the old New York county of Gloucester, organized by that province March 16, 1770, with Newbury as the shire town.

On September 3, 1783, as a result of the signing of the Treaty of Paris, the Revolutionary War ended with Great Britain recognizing the independence of the United States. Vermont's border with Quebec was established at 45 degrees north latitude.

On November 5, 1792, the legislature divided Chittenden and Orange counties into six separate counties, as follows: Chittenden, Orange, Franklin, Caledonia, Essex, and Orleans. No reason is given for the county being named after the county of Essex in England.

In 1999, a group of investors bought 86,212 acres (34,889 ha) from Champion International Paper for $7.5 million, covering parts of fourteen towns in the county. The state of Vermont and the Freeman Foundation purchased easements for $8.5 million to guarantee traditional uses of the land for logging and recreation. In 2008, Plum Creek Timber company announced plans to purchase this property.

The last murder trial held at the county courthouse took place in 1923. In 1973, a non-resident murdered another non-resident. In 2008, two residents died by homicide – the first in 85 years – when police said a young woman was shot by her boyfriend and a 59-year-old man shot his mother.

In 2012, a study indicated that county residents, overall, were the least healthy in the state. The rating was based on premature death, low birth weight, smoking, obesity, inactivity, excessive drinking, car crashes, sexually transmitted diseases, graduation rates, poverty, violent crime rates, air pollution, limited access to healthy food, unemployment, and the number of single parent households.

== Demographics ==
Historical population
Census	Pop.	Note	%±
1800	1,479		—
1810	3,087		108.7%
1820	3,284		6.4%
1830	3,981		21.2%
1840	4,226		6.2%
1850	4,650		10.0%
1860	5,786		24.4%
1870	6,811		17.7%
1880	7,931		16.4%
1890	9,511		19.9%
1900	8,056		−15.3%
1910	7,384		−8.3%
1920	7,364		−0.3%
1930	7,067		−4.0%
1940	6,490		−8.2%
1950	6,257		−3.6%
1960	6,083		−2.8%
1970	5,416		−11.0%
1980	6,313		16.6%
1990	6,405		1.5%
2000	6,459		0.8%
2010	6,306		−2.4%
2020	5,920		−6.1%
2025 (est.)	6,051	▲	2.2%
U.S. Decennial Census; 1790–1960 1900–1990; 1990–2000 2010–2020

=== 2020 census ===
As of the 2020 census, the county had a population of 5,920. Of the residents, 17.4% were under the age of 18 and 26.9% were 65 years of age or older; the median age was 52.1 years. For every 100 females there were 101.8 males, and for every 100 females age 18 and over there were 101.2 males.

The racial makeup of the county was 94.0% White, 0.3% Black or African American, 0.3% American Indian and Alaska Native, 0.3% Asian, 0.2% from some other race, and 4.9% from two or more races. Hispanic or Latino residents of any race comprised 1.1% of the population.

There were 2,695 households in the county, of which 21.0% had children under the age of 18 living with them and 23.4% had a female householder with no spouse or partner present. About 32.2% of all households were made up of individuals and 16.3% had someone living alone who was 65 years of age or older.

There were 4,867 housing units, of which 44.6% were vacant. Among occupied housing units, 80.1% were owner-occupied and 19.9% were renter-occupied. The homeowner vacancy rate was 3.6% and the rental vacancy rate was 9.3%.

Essex County, Vermont – Racial and ethnic composition Note: the US Census treats Hispanic/Latino as an ethnic category. This table excludes Latinos from the racial categories and assigns them to a separate category. Hispanics/Latinos may be of any race.
Race / Ethnicity (NH = Non-Hispanic)	Pop 2000	Pop 2010	Pop 2020	% 2000	% 2010	% 2020
White alone (NH)	6,218	6,094	5,544	96.26%	96.63%	93.64%
Black or African American alone (NH)	11	16	15	0.17%	0.25%	0.23%
Native American or Alaska Native alone (NH)	41	36	14	0.63%	0.57%	0.23%
Asian alone (NH)	17	22	16	0.26%	0.34%	0.27%
Pacific Islander alone (NH)	0	0	5	0.00%	0.00%	0.08%
Other race alone (NH)	4	1	5	0.06%	0.01%	0.08%
Mixed race or Multiracial (NH)	136	78	254	2.10%	1.23%	4.29%
Hispanic or Latino (any race)	32	59	67	0.49%	0.93%	1.13%
Total	6,459	6,306	5,920	100.00%	100.00%	100.00%

=== 2010 census ===
As of the 2010 United States census, there were 6,306 people, 2,818 households, and 1,814 families residing in the county. The population density was 9.5 inhabitants per square mile (3.7/km^{2}). There were 5,019 housing units at an average density of 7.6 per square mile (2.9/km^{2}).

Of the 2,818 households, 24.2% had children under the age of 18 living with them, 51.0% were married couples living together, 8.7% had a female householder with no husband present, 35.6% were non-families, and 29.3% of all households were made up of individuals. The average household size was 2.23 and the average family size was 2.70. The median age was 47.4 years.

The median income for a household in the county was $37,734 and the median income for a family was $46,263. Males had a median income of $37,021 versus $28,710 for females. The per capita income for the county was $20,040. About 13.0% of families and 16.9% of the population were below the poverty line, including 25.8% of those under age 18 and 10.3% of those age 65 or over.

== Geography ==
According to the U.S. Census Bureau, the county has a total area of 675 square miles (1,750 km^{2}), of which 664 square miles (1,720 km^{2}) is land and 12 square miles (31 km^{2}) (1.7%) is water.

In the north central portion of the county the Nulhegan Basin is a circular area roughly 10 miles (16 km) in diameter. While the origin of this basin may be either an asteroid hit or ancient volcano it has not been proven as either one so far. Within the basin is a bog and the Silvio O. Conte Fish and Wildlife Refuge with a visitor center, hiking trails, and viewing platforms where one can wait under shelter.

The county has many mountains and waterways. The Northern Forest Canoe Trail passes through this area along the Clyde, Nulhegan, and Connecticut rivers.

=== Adjacent counties ===
- Coös County, New Hampshire – east
- Grafton County, New Hampshire – south
- Caledonia County – southwest
- Orleans County – west
- Coaticook Regional County Municipality, Quebec – north

=== Major roads ===
- US 2
- VT 102
- VT 105
- VT 114

=== Fauna ===
In 2011, there were about 1,000 moose in the county. State officials estimated that this was about the "correct number" for a sustainable herd, with the moose not showing signs of starvation, nor the feeding grounds showing signs of overgrazing. In recent years the moose population has been suffering from infestations by ticks. Some moose have been found having as many as 10,000 ticks on one moose, thus causing death from anemia. Warmer winter weather in recent years has prevented the normal die-off of ticks from freezing.

=== National protected area ===
- Silvio O. Conte National Fish and Wildlife Refuge (part)

== Government ==
The Essex Senate district includes all of Essex County, as well as parts of Orleans County and Caledonia County. It is represented in the Vermont Senate by Russ Ingalls, a Republican.

The elected officials of the county as of the 2018 elections are as follows:

Position	Name	Party	First elected
State Senator	Robert A. Starr	Democratic	2004
State Senator	Russ Ingalls	Republican	2020
State Rep District 1	Terrie Lynn Williams	Republican	2020
State Rep District 2	Paul D. Lefebvre	Independent	2014
State's Attorney	Vincent Illuzzi	Prog/Rep/Dem/Lib	1998
Assistant Judge	Evan Hammond	Republican	2023
Assistant Judge	Kenn Stransky	Republican	2023
Probate Judge	Samuel Swope	Independent	2023
Sheriff	Trevor Colby	Rep/Prog	2010
High Bailiff	Eric Engels	N/A	2023
Justices of the Peace:

Justices of the Peace

Current composition of justices.

Town	Name	Party	First elected
Bloomfield; 5	Sharon Belknap	Republican	2014
Bloomfield; 5	Martin Lomansey	Independent	2012
Bloomfield; 5	Raymond Bowen Jr.	Independent	2014
Bloomfield; 5	Steven Bunnell	Republican	2016
Bloomfield; 5	Suzanne Routhier	Independent	2006
Brighton; 7	Krystyna Kurzej	Democratic	2016
Brighton; 7	Stephanie Nagle	Democratic	2012
Brighton; 7	Janet Osborne	Democratic	2014
Brighton; 7	Peder Pederson	Independent	2014
Brighton; 7	Susan Pederson	Independent	2012
Brighton; 7	David Robbins	Republican	2014
Brighton; 7	Dolores Robbins	Republican	2014
Brunswick; 5	Sharon Graham	Independent	2008
Brunswick; 5	Claudette Hook	Independent	2012
Brunswick; 5	June Hook	Independent	2012
Brunswick; 5	Deborah Tetreault	Independent	2010
Brunswick; 5	Janet Washburn	Independent	2016
Canaan; 7	Martha Allen	Democratic	2012
Canaan; 7	Irving Cullivan	Democratic	2012
Canaan; 7	Michael Daley	Democratic	2014
Canaan; 7	Renee Marchesseault	Republican	2004
Canaan; 7	Judith Masson	Democratic	2008
Canaan; 7	Fern Owen Brown	Democratic	2016
Canaan; 7	Vacant	N/A	
Concord; 5	Linda Blakslee	Republican	2012
Concord; 5	Paula N. Christopher	Republican	2018
Concord; 5	Mary Gochie	Republican	2010
Concord; 5	Nancy Goodwin	Republican	2008
Concord; 5	Arlene Hovey	Republican	2012
East Haven; 5	Robert J. Burke	Democratic	2008
East Haven; 5	Franklin Higgins	Independent	2014
East Haven; 5	Michael Masure	Republican	2012
East Haven; 5	Delbert Reed	Republican	2016
East Haven; 5	Bonnie Ricci	Democratic	2014
Granby; 5	Bruce Berryman	Republican	2016
Granby; 5	Reginald Bunnell	Republican	2012
Granby; 5	Calvin Noble	Republican	2006
Granby; 5	John Noble	Republican	2008
Granby; 5	Sonia Peters	Republican	2008
Guildhall; 5	Casey Dowland	Republican	2014
Guildhall; 5	Valerie Foy	Democratic	2010
Guildhall; 5	Kelly McLain	Republican	2016
Guildhall; 5	Alfred McVetty	Republican	2014
Guildhall; 5	Jacqueline Spillane	Republican	2018
Lemington; 5	Myra Ellingwood	Democratic	2012
Lemington; 5	Walter Noyes	Independent	2010
Lemington; 5	Michelle Thibault	Republican	2018
Lemington; 5	Mary Jane Walker	Republican	2016
Lemington; 5	Linda Young	Democratic	2016
Lunenburg; 5	Maren Downing	Republican	2014
Lunenburg; 5	Gisele Hallee	Independent	2016
Lunenburg; 5	Patricia Kenny	Republican	2008
Lunenburg; 5	James Peyton	Independent	2016
Lunenburg; 5	Barbara Willson	Independent	2016
Maidstone; 3	Bruce Hobaugh	Independent	2012
Maidstone; 3	Cheryl McVetty	Independent	2016
Maidstone; 3	Gail Tattan Giampalo	Independent	2016
Norton; 5	Janice Daniels	Republican	2016
Norton; 5	Betsy Fontaine	Republican	2018
Norton; 5	Andre Gagnon	Republican	2016
Norton; 5	Franklin Henry	Republican	2012
Norton; 5	Kenneth Stransky	Republican	2016
Victory; 5	Zane Cooke	Independent	2014
Victory; 5	Laurie Gilman	Republican	2018
Victory; 5	Howard Lynaugh	Independent	2016
Victory; 5	Sylvia McKinstry	Republican	2016
Victory; 5	Lori Miller	Independent	2016

=== Elections ===
Essex County is a historically Republican county in presidential elections, supporting the party in all but seven elections since its founding.

In 1828, Essex County voted for National Republican Party candidate John Quincy Adams. Democrats would win the county in 1832 and 1836, then Whigs from 1840 to 1852, and Republicans from John C. Frémont in 1856 to Alf Landon in 1936. Since the latter election, the Democrats carried the county in 1940, 1944, 1964, 1992, 1996, 2008, and 2012. Since 1980, Essex County is a bellwether county, consistently backing the national winner except in 2020.

United States presidential election results for Essex County, Vermont
Year	Republican		Democratic		Third party(ies)	
Year	No.	%	No.	%	No.	%
1880	853	64.14%	472	35.49%	5	0.38%
1884	898	61.46%	500	34.22%	63	4.31%
1888	907	61.62%	502	34.10%	63	4.28%
1892	721	61.36%	418	35.57%	36	3.06%
1896	873	72.99%	277	23.16%	46	3.85%
1900	758	67.50%	358	31.88%	7	0.62%
1904	750	75.53%	233	23.46%	10	1.01%
1908	744	68.07%	327	29.92%	22	2.01%
1912	463	39.01%	348	29.32%	376	31.68%
1916	734	56.77%	544	42.07%	15	1.16%
1920	1,243	68.90%	552	30.60%	9	0.50%
1924	1,391	63.60%	576	26.34%	220	10.06%
1928	1,703	67.74%	805	32.02%	6	0.24%
1932	1,567	52.58%	1,397	46.88%	16	0.54%
1936	1,474	55.00%	1,203	44.89%	3	0.11%
1940	1,365	46.96%	1,531	52.67%	11	0.38%
1944	1,064	48.58%	1,126	51.42%	0	0.00%
1948	1,055	54.21%	881	45.27%	10	0.51%
1952	1,592	69.04%	705	30.57%	9	0.39%
1956	1,714	70.42%	719	29.54%	1	0.04%
1960	1,439	57.51%	1,063	42.49%	0	0.00%
1964	750	30.95%	1,673	69.05%	0	0.00%
1968	1,009	49.83%	952	47.01%	64	3.16%
1972	1,441	68.29%	655	31.04%	14	0.66%
1976	1,161	53.04%	1,002	45.77%	26	1.19%
1980	1,305	55.77%	799	34.15%	236	10.09%
1984	1,632	69.48%	693	29.50%	24	1.02%
1988	1,535	64.20%	837	35.01%	19	0.79%
1992	1,038	34.65%	1,092	36.45%	866	28.91%
1996	819	33.44%	1,120	45.73%	510	20.82%
2000	1,564	54.08%	1,129	39.04%	199	6.88%
2004	1,591	54.17%	1,276	43.45%	70	2.38%
2008	1,284	41.41%	1,733	55.89%	84	2.71%
2012	1,164	41.60%	1,539	55.00%	95	3.40%
2016	1,506	51.49%	1,019	34.84%	400	13.68%
2020	1,773	53.92%	1,405	42.73%	110	3.35%
2024	1,890	55.18%	1,344	39.24%	191	5.58%

== Media ==
WVTI 106.9 broadcasts from Island Pond, Vermont.

== Communities ==
=== Towns ===
- Bloomfield
- Brighton
- Brunswick
- Canaan
- Concord
- East Haven
- Granby
- Guildhall (shire town)
- Lemington
- Lunenburg
- Maidstone
- Norton
- Victory

=== Census-designated places ===
- Beecher Falls
- Canaan
- Concord
- Gilman
- Island Pond
- Lunenburg

=== Unincorporated communities ===
- North Concord

In Vermont, gores and grants are unincorporated portions of a county which are not part on any town and have limited self-government (if any, as many are uninhabited).

- Avery's Gore
- Warner's Grant
- Warren Gore

In addition, three formally chartered towns have never had sufficient population to organize. Those which are inhabited also have limited self-government.

- Averill
- Ferdinand
- Lewis

== See also ==
- National Register of Historic Places listings in Essex County, Vermont
