= Maidstone, Vermont =

- Town
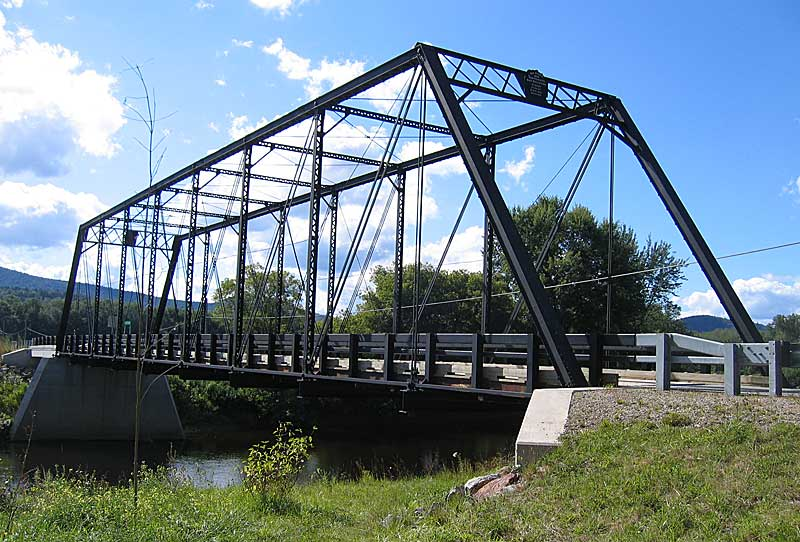
- The Janice Peaslee Bridge goes over the Connecticut River and connects Maidstone to Stratford, NH.

- Logo

- Location in Essex County and the state of Vermont
- Coordinates: 44°38′30″N 71°37′00″W
- Country: United States
- State: Vermont
- County: Essex

Area
  - Total: 32.3 sq mi (83.6 km^{2})
  - Land: 30.5 sq mi (79.1 km^{2})
  - Water: 1.7 sq mi (4.5 km^{2})
- Elevation: 1,404 ft (428 m)

Population (2020)
  - Total: 211
  - Density: 7.0/sq mi (2.7/km^{2})
- Time zone: UTC-5 (EST)
  - Summer (DST): UTC-4 (EDT)
- ZIP code: 05905
- Area code: 802
- FIPS code: 50-42475
- GNIS feature ID: 1462141
- Website: www.maidstone-vt.org

Maidstone is a town in Essex County, Vermont, United States. As of the 2020 census, the town had a population of 211. It is part of the Berlin, NH –VT Micropolitan Statistical Area. There is no town center or gas station, but there is a town office building in the southern part of the town.

== History ==
The town was named after Maidstone, in England.

== Geography ==
Maidstone is in eastern Essex County along the Connecticut River, the state boundary between Vermont and New Hampshire. The town is bordered by Guildhall to the south, Granby to the southwest, Ferdinand to the northwest, and Brunswick to the north, all in Vermont. Across the Connecticut River are the New Hampshire towns of Stratford to the northeast and Northumberland to the east. The only crossing of the Connecticut River from Maidstone is the Janice Peaslee Bridge in the northern part of town, leading to Stratford village. Vermont Route 102 travels the length of the east side of town, staying in the Connecticut River valley.

According to the United States Census Bureau, the town has a total area of 32.3 square miles (83.6 km^{2}), of which 30.5 square miles (79.1 km^{2}) is land and 1.7 square miles (4.5 km^{2}), or 5.39%, is water. Maidstone Lake is a large water body in the western part of town. Maidstone State Park is on the east and south sides of the lake, offering camping, fishing, swimming, and hiking. The highest point in the town is 2,143-foot (653 m) Stoneham Mountain, east of Maidstone Lake.

== Demographics ==
Historical population
| Census | Pop. | Note | %± |
|---|---|---|---|
| 1790 | 125 | | — |
| 1800 | 152 | | 21.6% |
| 1810 | 177 | | 16.4% |
| 1820 | 166 | | −6.2% |
| 1830 | 236 | | 42.2% |
| 1840 | 271 | | 14.8% |
| 1850 | 237 | | −12.5% |
| 1860 | 259 | | 9.3% |
| 1870 | 254 | | −1.9% |
| 1880 | 286 | | 12.6% |
| 1890 | 198 | | −30.8% |
| 1900 | 206 | | 4.0% |
| 1910 | 175 | | −15.0% |
| 1920 | 171 | | −2.3% |
| 1930 | 123 | | −28.1% |
| 1940 | 96 | | −22.0% |
| 1950 | 81 | | −15.6% |
| 1960 | 78 | | −3.7% |
| 1970 | 94 | | 20.5% |
| 1980 | 100 | | 6.4% |
| 1990 | 131 | | 31.0% |
| 2000 | 105 | | −19.8% |
| 2010 | 208 | | 98.1% |
| 2020 | 211 | | 1.4% |
U.S. Decennial Census

At the 2000 census there were 105 people in 45 households, including 30 families, in the town. The population density was 3.4 inhabitants per square mile (1.3/km^{2}). There were 276 housing units at an average density of 9.1 per square mile (3.5/km^{2}). The racial makeup of the town was 97.14% White, 0.95% African American, 0.95% Native American and 0.95% Asian. Of the 45 households 20.0% had children under the age of 18 living with them, 55.6% were married couples living together, 4.4% had a female householder with no husband present, and 33.3% were non-families. 24.4% of households were one person and 8.9% were one person aged 65 or older. The average household size was 2.33 and the average family size was 2.77.

The age distribution was 14.3% under the age of 18, 4.8% from 18 to 24, 28.6% from 25 to 44, 41.0% from 45 to 64, and 11.4% 65 or older. The median age was 46 years. For every 100 females, there were 133.3 males. For every 100 females age 18 and over, there were 114.3 males.

The median household income was $19,167 and the median family income was $27,500. Males had a median income of $30,313 versus $17,500 for females. The per capita income for the town was $15,668. There were 6.7% of families and 8.7% of the population living below the poverty line, including no under eighteens and none of those over 64.

== Politics ==
Like the rest of northeastern Vermont, Maidstone has historically voted for the Republican Party. The town did vote for Barack Obama in 2008, but was one of only two towns in the state to vote for Mitt Romney over Barack Obama in 2012. In Vermont's 2014 elections, the town voted solidly for Republicans Phil Scott for governor and Scott Milne for lieutenant governor.
