= Granby, Vermont =

- Town
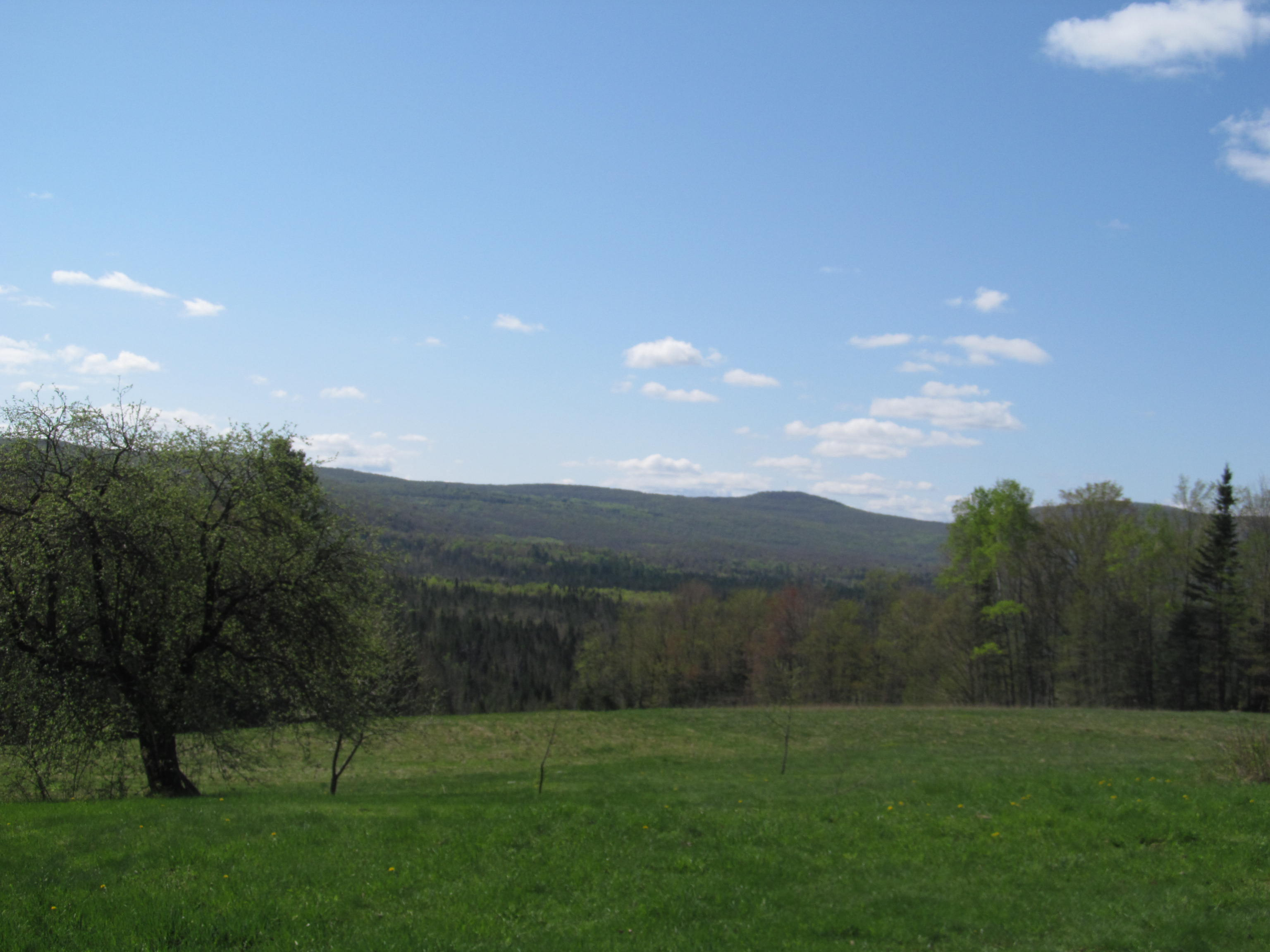
- View of Granby area

- Location in Essex County and the state of Vermont
- Coordinates: 44°37′15″N 71°44′30″W
- Country: United States
- State: Vermont
- County: Essex

Area
  - Total: 39.1 sq mi (101.2 km^{2})
  - Land: 39.0 sq mi (101.1 km^{2})
  - Water: 0.039 sq mi (0.1 km^{2})
- Elevation: 1,775 ft (541 m)

Population (2020)
  - Total: 81
  - Density: 2.1/sq mi (0.80/km^{2})
- Time zone: UTC-5 (EST)
  - Summer (DST): UTC-4 (EDT)
- ZIP codes: 05840 (Granby); 05858 (North Concord); 05905 (Guildhall)
- Area code: 802
- FIPS code: 50-29125
- GNIS feature ID: 1462106
- Website: www.granbyvt.gov

Granby is a town in Essex County, Vermont, United States. The town was named for the Marquis of Granby. The population was 81 at the 2020 census. Granby is part of the Berlin, NH-VT Micropolitan Statistical Area. Along with the neighboring town of Victory, Granby was one of the last two towns in Vermont to be linked to the electric grid, in 1963.

== Geography ==
According to the United States Census Bureau, the town has a total area of 39.1 square miles (101.2 km^{2}), of which 39.0 square miles (101.1 km^{2}) is land and 0.1 square mile (0.1 km^{2}) (0.13%) is water.

== Demographics ==
Historical population
Census	Pop.	Note	%±
1800	69		—
1810	120		73.9%
1820	49		−59.2%
1830	97		98.0%
1840	105		8.2%
1850	127		21.0%
1860	132		3.9%
1870	174		31.8%
1880	194		11.5%
1890	361		86.1%
1900	182		−49.6%
1910	95		−47.8%
1920	70		−26.3%
1930	69		−1.4%
1940	76		10.1%
1950	74		−2.6%
1960	56		−24.3%
1970	52		−7.1%
1980	70		34.6%
1990	85		21.4%
2000	86		1.2%
2010	88		2.3%
2020	81		−8.0%
U.S. Decennial Census

As of the census of 2000, there were 86 people, 33 households, and 26 families residing in the town. The population density was 2.2 inhabitants per square mile (0.85/km^{2}). There were 78 housing units at an average density of 2.0 per square mile (0.77/km^{2}). The racial makeup of the town was 98.84% White, and 1.16% from two or more races. 32.3% were of English, 19.4% French, 16.1% Scottish, 9.7% French Canadian, 9.7% Irish, 6.5% Finnish and 6.5% Swedish ancestry according to Census 2000.

There were 33 households, out of which 33.3% had children under the age of 18 living with them, 72.7% were married couples living together, 3.0% had a female householder with no husband present, and 18.2% were non-families. 12.1% of all households were made up of individuals, and 6.1% had someone living alone who was 65 years of age or older. The average household size was 2.61 and the average family size was 2.89.

In the town, the population was spread out, with 24.4% under the age of 18, 5.8% from 18 to 24, 29.1% from 25 to 44, 26.7% from 45 to 64, and 14.0% who were 65 years of age or older. The median age was 42 years. For every 100 females, there were 87.0 males. For every 100 females age 18 and over, there were 97.0 males.

The median income for a household in the town was $39,375, and the median income for a family was $39,375. Males had a median income of $31,250 versus $18,750 for females. The per capita income for the town was $30,343. None of the population or families were below the poverty line.
