= Victory, Vermont =

- Town
- Location in Essex County and the state of Vermont.
- Coordinates: 44°32′28″N 71°49′10″W
- Country: United States
- State: Vermont
- County: Essex
- Communities: Victory; Gallup Mills

Government
  - Type: New England town

Area
  - Total: 43.0 sq mi (111.4 km^{2})
  - Land: 43.0 sq mi (111.3 km^{2})
  - Water: 0.039 sq mi (0.1 km^{2})
- Elevation: 1,194 ft (364 m)

Population (2020)
  - Total: 70
  - Density: 1.6/sq mi (0.63/km^{2})
- Time zone: UTC-5 (EST)
  - Summer (DST): UTC-4 (EDT)
- ZIP code: 05858
- Area code: 802
- FIPS code: 50-75175
- GNIS feature ID: 1462236

Victory is a town in Essex County, Vermont, United States. The population was 70 at the 2020 census. It is part of the Berlin, NH –VT Micropolitan Statistical Area. Victory was, along with neighboring Granby, one of the last two towns in Vermont to be linked to the electric grid, in 1963.

== Geography ==
According to the United States Census Bureau, the town has a total area of 43.0 square miles (111.4 km^{2}), of which 43.0 square miles (111.3 km^{2}) is land and 0.04 square mile (0.1 km^{2}) (0.07%) is water.

== Demographics ==
Historical population
Census	Pop.	Note	%±
1810	6		—
1830	53		—
1840	140		164.2%
1850	168		20.0%
1860	212		26.2%
1870	263		24.1%
1880	321		22.1%
1890	564		75.7%
1900	321		−43.1%
1910	206		−35.8%
1920	125		−39.3%
1930	80		−36.0%
1940	104		30.0%
1950	49		−52.9%
1960	46		−6.1%
1970	42		−8.7%
1980	56		33.3%
1990	50		−10.7%
2000	97		94.0%
2010	62		−36.1%
2020	70		12.9%
U.S. Decennial Census

As of the census of 2000, there were 97 people, 45 households, and 27 families residing in the town. The population density was 2.3 inhabitants per square mile (0.89/km^{2}). There were 90 housing units at an average density of 2.1 per square mile (0.81/km^{2}). The racial makeup of the town was 97.94% White, 1.03% from other races, and 1.03% from two or more races. Hispanic or Latino of any race were 1.03% of the population.

There were 45 households, out of which 17.8% had children under the age of 18 living with them, 53.3% were married couples living together, 6.7% had a female householder with no husband present, and 40.0% were non-families. 26.7% of all households were made up of individuals, and 11.1% had someone living alone who was 65 years of age or older. The average household size was 2.16 and the average family size was 2.67.

In the town, the population was spread out, with 17.5% under the age of 18, 4.1% from 18 to 24, 24.7% from 25 to 44, 35.1% from 45 to 64, and 18.6% who were 65 years of age or older. The median age was 46 years. For every 100 females, there were 115.6 males. For every 100 females age 18 and over, there were 128.6 males.

The median income for a household in the town was $28,750, and the median income for a family was $38,333. Males had a median income of $28,750 versus $30,000 for females. The per capita income for the town was $18,558. There were 6.7% of families and 13.2% of the population living below the poverty line, including 21.1% of under eighteens and none of those over 64.
