= East Haven, Vermont =

- Town
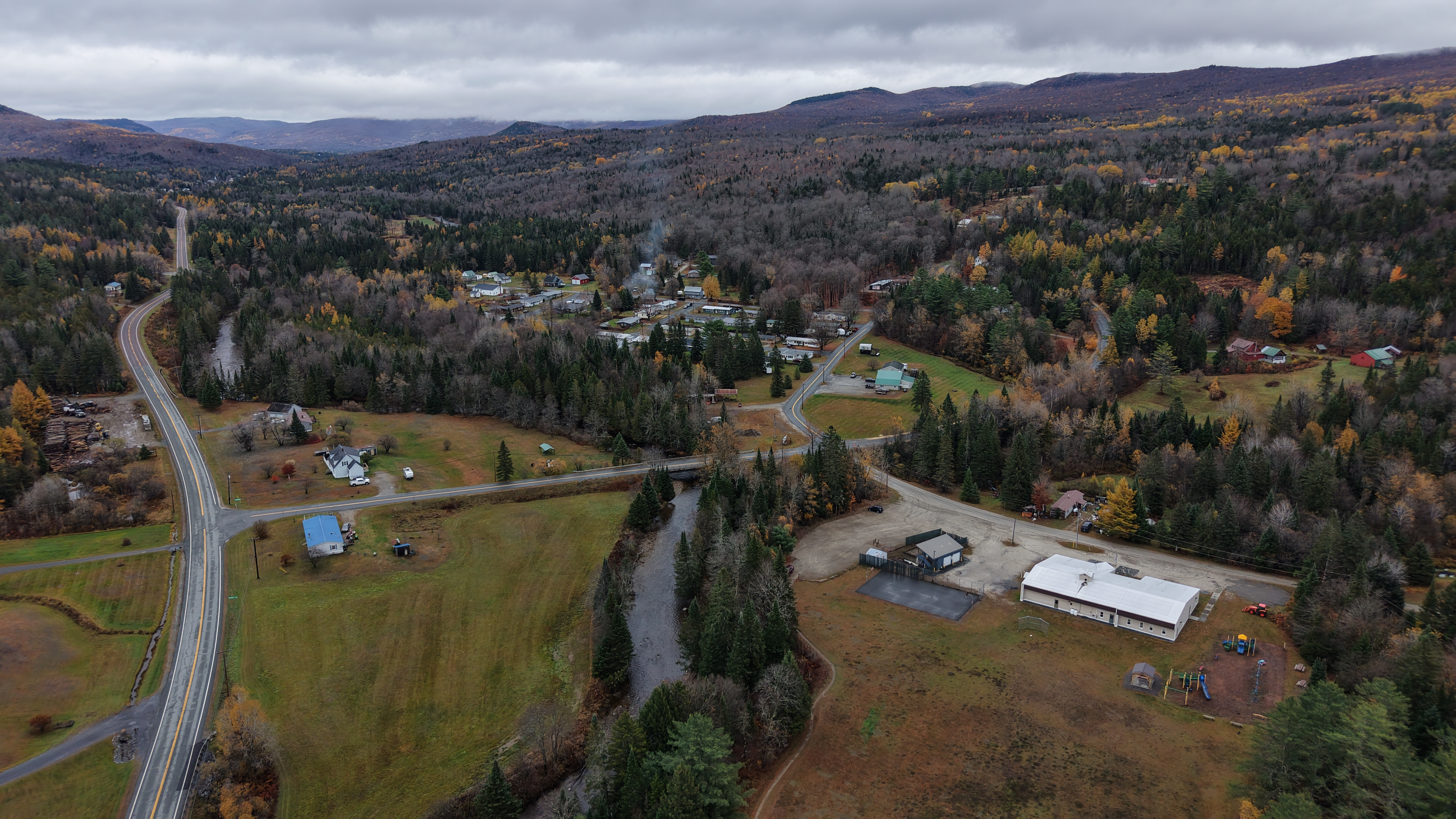
- East Haven, VT, from the southwest

- Location in Essex County and the state of Vermont
- Coordinates: 44°39′06″N 71°49′21″W
- Country: United States
- State: Vermont
- County: Essex
- Communities: East Haven; Hartwellville; Lost Nation

Area
  - Total: 37.4 sq mi (96.9 km^{2})
  - Land: 37.4 sq mi (96.9 km^{2})
  - Water: 0 sq mi (0.0 km^{2})
- Elevation: 2,172 ft (662 m)

Population (2020)
  - Total: 270
  - Density: 7.3/sq mi (2.8/km^{2})
- Time zone: UTC-5 (EST)
  - Summer (DST): UTC-4 (EDT)
- ZIP code: 05837
- Area code: 802
- FIPS code: 50-21250
- GNIS feature ID: 1462086
- Website: sites.google.com/view/east-haven-vt

East Haven is a town in Essex County, Vermont, United States. The population was 270 at the 2020 census. It is part of the Berlin, NH–VT Micropolitan Statistical Area.

== Geography ==
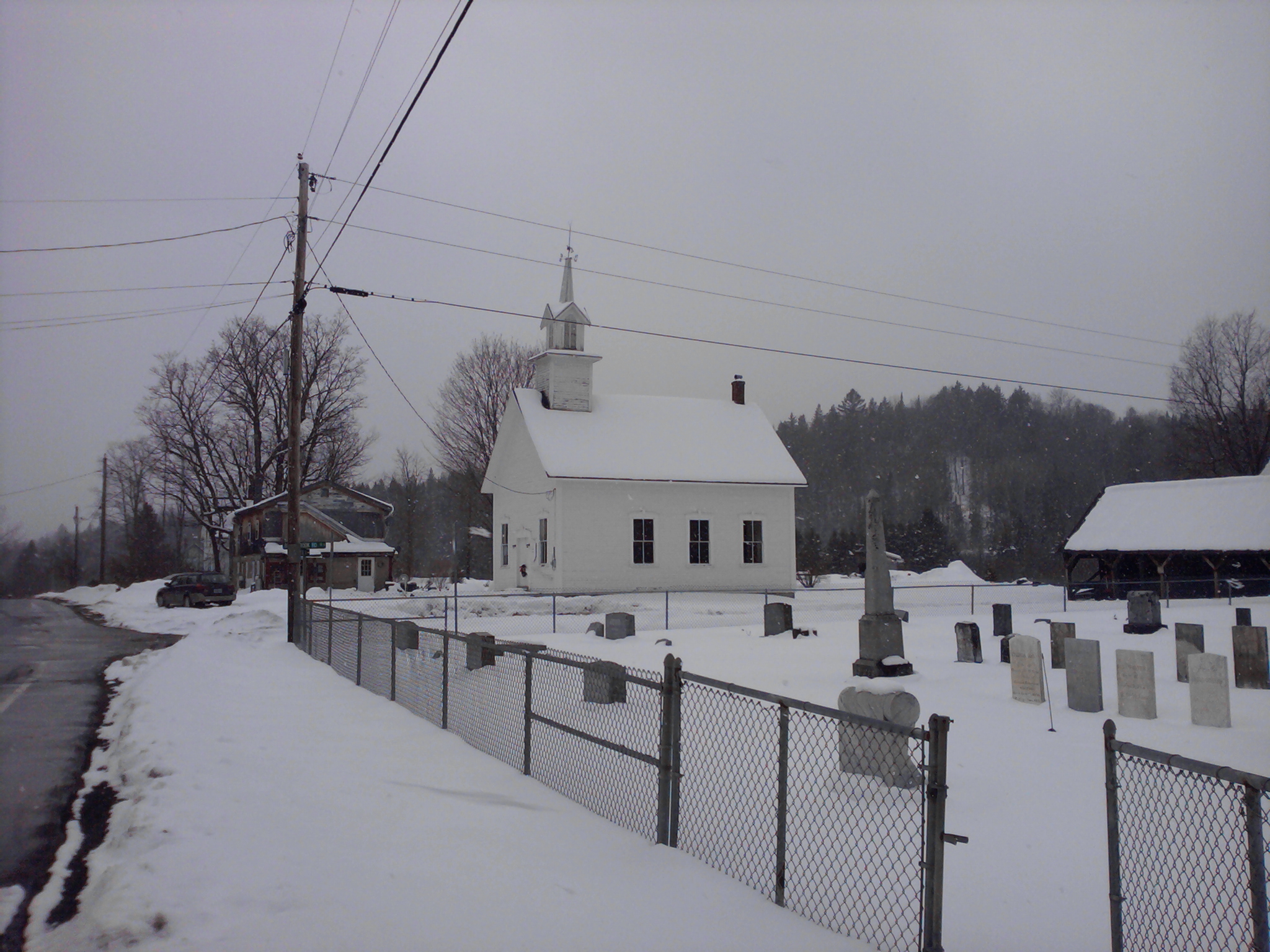
East Haven Chapel

According to the United States Census Bureau, the town has a total area of 37.4 square miles (96.9 km^{2}), all land.

=== Climate ===
Climate data for East Haven, Vermont, 1991–2020 normals, snowfall 2002-2020: 1000ft (305m)
Month	Jan	Feb	Mar	Apr	May	Jun	Jul	Aug	Sep	Oct	Nov	Dec	Year
Record high °F (°C)	54 (12)	61 (16)	81 (27)	87 (31)	92 (33)	94 (34)	94 (34)	93 (34)	93 (34)	80 (27)	71 (22)	63 (17)	94 (34)
Mean maximum °F (°C)	43 (6)	48 (9)	57 (14)	76 (24)	84 (29)	88 (31)	89 (32)	88 (31)	85 (29)	75 (24)	64 (18)	50 (10)	91 (33)
Mean daily maximum °F (°C)	24.4 (−4.2)	27.8 (−2.3)	37.0 (2.8)	50.9 (10.5)	64.4 (18.0)	73.2 (22.9)	77.5 (25.3)	77.0 (25.0)	69.2 (20.7)	55.0 (12.8)	41.2 (5.1)	29.7 (−1.3)	52.3 (11.3)
Daily mean °F (°C)	11.8 (−11.2)	13.9 (−10.1)	23.8 (−4.6)	38.1 (3.4)	50.6 (10.3)	59.6 (15.3)	64.3 (17.9)	63.4 (17.4)	55.3 (12.9)	43.4 (6.3)	31.2 (−0.4)	20.0 (−6.7)	39.6 (4.2)
Mean daily minimum °F (°C)	−0.8 (−18.2)	0.1 (−17.7)	10.6 (−11.9)	25.3 (−3.7)	36.9 (2.7)	46.0 (7.8)	51.2 (10.7)	49.8 (9.9)	41.3 (5.2)	31.8 (−0.1)	21.2 (−6.0)	10.2 (−12.1)	27.0 (−2.8)
Mean minimum °F (°C)	−23 (−31)	−21 (−29)	−15 (−26)	12 (−11)	24 (−4)	33 (1)	41 (5)	39 (4)	27 (−3)	19 (−7)	4 (−16)	−13 (−25)	−26 (−32)
Record low °F (°C)	−36 (−38)	−37 (−38)	−35 (−37)	−3 (−19)	19 (−7)	29 (−2)	34 (1)	32 (0)	18 (−8)	12 (−11)	−13 (−25)	−28 (−33)	−37 (−38)
Average precipitation inches (mm)	2.70 (69)	2.30 (58)	2.69 (68)	3.49 (89)	4.06 (103)	4.37 (111)	4.58 (116)	4.23 (107)	3.74 (95)	4.35 (110)	3.36 (85)	3.44 (87)	43.31 (1,098)
Average snowfall inches (cm)	19.7 (50)	22.5 (57)	16.2 (41)	5.0 (13)	0.3 (0.76)	0.0 (0.0)	0.0 (0.0)	0.0 (0.0)	0.0 (0.0)	0.9 (2.3)	7.4 (19)	22.1 (56)	94.1 (239.06)
Source 1: NOAA
Source 2: XMACIS (snowfall, temp records & monthly max/mins)

== Demographics ==
Historical population
Census	Pop.	Note	%±
1830	33		—
1840	79		139.4%
1850	94		19.0%
1860	136		44.7%
1870	191		40.4%
1880	225		17.8%
1890	236		4.9%
1900	171		−27.5%
1910	194		13.5%
1920	148		−23.7%
1930	99		−33.1%
1940	92		−7.1%
1950	85		−7.6%
1960	164		92.9%
1970	197		20.1%
1980	280		42.1%
1990	269		−3.9%
2000	301		11.9%
2010	290		−3.7%
2020	270		−6.9%
U.S. Decennial Census

As of the census of 2000, there were 301 people, 119 households, and 91 families residing in the town. The population density was 8.0 inhabitants per square mile (3.1/km^{2}). There were 173 housing units at an average density of 4.6 per square mile (1.8/km^{2}). The racial makeup of the town was 97.01% White, 1.33% African American, 1.00% Asian, 0.33% from other races, and 0.33% from two or more races. Hispanic or Latino of any race were 0.66% of the population.

There were 119 households, out of which 37.8% had children under the age of 18 living with them, 64.7% were married couples living together, 8.4% had a female householder with no husband present, and 23.5% were non-families. 18.5% of all households were made up of individuals, and 5.9% had someone living alone who was 65 years of age or older. The average household size was 2.53 and the average family size was 2.82.

In the town, the population was spread out, with 24.9% under the age of 18, 6.0% from 18 to 24, 28.6% from 25 to 44, 29.6% from 45 to 64, and 11.0% who were 65 years of age or older. The median age was 37 years. For every 100 females, there were 96.7 males. For every 100 females age 18 and over, there were 98.2 males.

The median income for a household in the town was $34,375, and the median income for a family was $36,094. Males had a median income of $32,292 versus $19,500 for females. The per capita income for the town was $13,330. About 13.8% of families and 18.6% of the population were below the poverty line, including 23.4% of those under the age of eighteen and 7.3% of those 65 or over.

== Kingdom Trails Association ==
In the Summer of 2018 an expansion network of mountain bike trails were built by KTA on the property owned by Walter and Winny Norman. The network of trails called Moose Haven have a trail-head located adjacent to East Haven's municipal buildings. The trails consist of a primary fire road (Haul Road) that serves as the climbing trail (approx. 700 feet of vertical) with several flowy, gravity fed trails that extend off of it. Stormin Norman and Black Bear are the longest and most commonly ridden trails of Moose Haven; they feature large berms, natural features and several jumps, gaps, and rollers.

== North Concord Air Force Base ==
There is an abandoned Air Force base in East Haven. Opened in 1956 and left to rot in the late 1980s, the base is popular with urban explorers. The base is on private property and trespassing is forbidden.
