= Bloomfield, Vermont =

- Town
- Bloomfield, Vermont, from the southwest

- Location in Essex County and the state of Vermont.
- Coordinates: 44°48′43″N 71°38′16″W
- Country: United States
- State: Vermont
- County: Essex

Area
  - Total: 40.5 sq mi (105.0 km^{2})
  - Land: 40.3 sq mi (104.4 km^{2})
  - Water: 0.23 sq mi (0.6 km^{2})
- Elevation: 1,755 ft (535 m)

Population (2020)
  - Total: 217
  - Density: 5.4/sq mi (2.1/km^{2})
  - Households: 101
  - Families: 75
- Time zone: UTC-5 (EST)
  - Summer (DST): UTC-4 (EDT)
- ZIP code: 05905
- Area code: 802
- FIPS code: 50-009-06325
- GNIS feature ID: 1462044

Bloomfield is a town in Essex County, Vermont, United States. The population was 217 at the 2020 census. It is part of the Berlin, New Hampshire-Vermont Micropolitan Statistical Area.

== History ==
In 1830, an act from the state General Assembly changed the name of the town from "Minehead" to "Bloomfield." The construction of Nulhegan Mill in 1849 created jobs and grew the town's population.

== Geography ==
Bloomfield is in northeastern Essex County, along the Connecticut River, which forms the state line with New Hampshire. The town is bordered to the southwest by Brunswick, to the northwest by Lewis, at its northernmost point by Averill, and to the northeast by Lemington, Vermont, while to the southeast, across the river, it is bordered by the towns of Columbia and Stratford, New Hampshire. The settlement of Bloomfield is in the southern corner of the town, at the mouth of the Nulhegan River in the Connecticut, and connected by bridge to the village of North Stratford, New Hampshire.

Vermont Route 102 follows the Connecticut River along the southeastern edge of the town, leading northeast 13 miles (21 km) to Colebrook, New Hampshire, and south 15 miles (24 km) to Guildhall, Vermont, while Vermont Route 105 leads west up the Nulhegan River 16 miles (26 km) to Island Pond.

According to the United States Census Bureau, the town has a total area of 40.5 square miles (105.0 km^{2}), of which 40.3 square miles (104.4 km^{2}) is land and 0.2 square miles (0.6 km^{2}), or 0.59%, is water. The highest point in the town is 2,470 feet (750 m) along the northeast boundary.

Much of the town's land is at a high elevation, but the population is concentrated along the river where the elevation is much lower.

=== Climate ===
A weather station was run in the town from 1906 to 1968. It was located at the southeast edge of town, near Lyman Falls along the Connecticut River. On December 30, 1933, Bloomfield set a record low temperature for New England with −50 °F (−46 °C), a record not tied until 2009 when a small station along the Big Black River, Maine, also recorded −50 °F (−46 °C) on January 16.

Climate data for Bloomfield (1906–1968); elevation 940 feet
Month	Jan	Feb	Mar	Apr	May	Jun	Jul	Aug	Sep	Oct	Nov	Dec	Year
Record high °F (°C)	62 (17)	68 (20)	78 (26)	87 (31)	96 (36)	99 (37)	98 (37)	97 (36)	98 (37)	88 (31)	75 (24)	62 (17)	99 (37)
Mean daily maximum °F (°C)	27 (−3)	29 (−2)	39 (4)	52 (11)	66 (19)	76 (24)	80 (27)	78 (26)	70 (21)	59 (15)	43 (6)	30 (−1)	55 (13)
Mean daily minimum °F (°C)	3 (−16)	3 (−16)	14 (−10)	28 (−2)	38 (3)	48 (9)	53 (12)	51 (11)	44 (7)	34 (1)	24 (−4)	10 (−12)	29 (−2)
Record low °F (°C)	−44 (−42)	−45 (−43)	−32 (−36)	−12 (−24)	14 (−10)	25 (−4)	30 (−1)	23 (−5)	20 (−7)	6 (−14)	−15 (−26)	−50 (−46)	−50 (−46)
Average precipitation inches (mm)	2.3 (58)	2.0 (51)	2.2 (56)	2.9 (74)	3.2 (81)	4.0 (100)	4.1 (100)	3.9 (99)	3.7 (94)	3.5 (89)	3.2 (81)	2.5 (64)	37.8 (960)
Average snowfall inches (cm)	23.0 (58)	20.6 (52)	15.0 (38)	5.1 (13)	0.4 (1.0)	0 (0)	0 (0)	0 (0)	0 (0)	1.3 (3.3)	8.7 (22)	18.3 (46)	92.4 (233.3)
Source: Desert Research Institute

== Demographics ==
Historical population
Census	Pop.	Note	%±
1800	27		—
1810	144		433.3%
1820	132		−8.3%
1830	150		13.6%
1840	179		19.3%
1850	244		36.3%
1860	320		31.1%
1870	455		42.2%
1880	627		37.8%
1890	827		31.9%
1900	504		−39.1%
1910	496		−1.6%
1920	382		−23.0%
1930	417		9.2%
1940	326		−21.8%
1950	291		−10.7%
1960	212		−27.1%
1970	196		−7.5%
1980	188		−4.1%
1990	253		34.6%
2000	261		3.2%
2010	221		−15.3%
2020	217		−1.8%
U.S. Decennial Census

At the 2000 census there were 261 people in 101 households, including 75 families, in the town. The population density was 6.5 inhabitants per square mile (2.5/km^{2}). There were 191 housing units at an average density of 4.7 per square mile (1.8/km^{2}). The racial makeup of the town was 95.40% White, 1.53% Native American, 0.38% Asian, and 2.68% from two or more races. Of the 101 households 34.7% had children under the age of 18 living with them, 61.4% were married couples living together, 6.9% had a female householder with no husband present, and 25.7% were non-families. 23.8% of households were one person and 13.9% were one person aged 65 or older. The average household size was 2.58 and the average family size was 3.03.

The age distribution was 27.2% under the age of 18, 4.2% from 18 to 24, 29.9% from 25 to 44, 23.8% from 45 to 64, and 14.9% 65 or older. The median age was 39 years. For every 100 females, there were 119.3 males. For every 100 females age 18 and over, there were 108.8 males.

The median household income was $33,500 and the median family income was $39,167. Males had a median income of $27,708 versus $20,357 for females. The per capita income for the town was $17,224. About 3.2% of families and 4.0% of the population were below the poverty line, including none of those under the age of eighteen and 7.7% of those sixty-five or over.
