= Guildhall, Vermont =

- Town
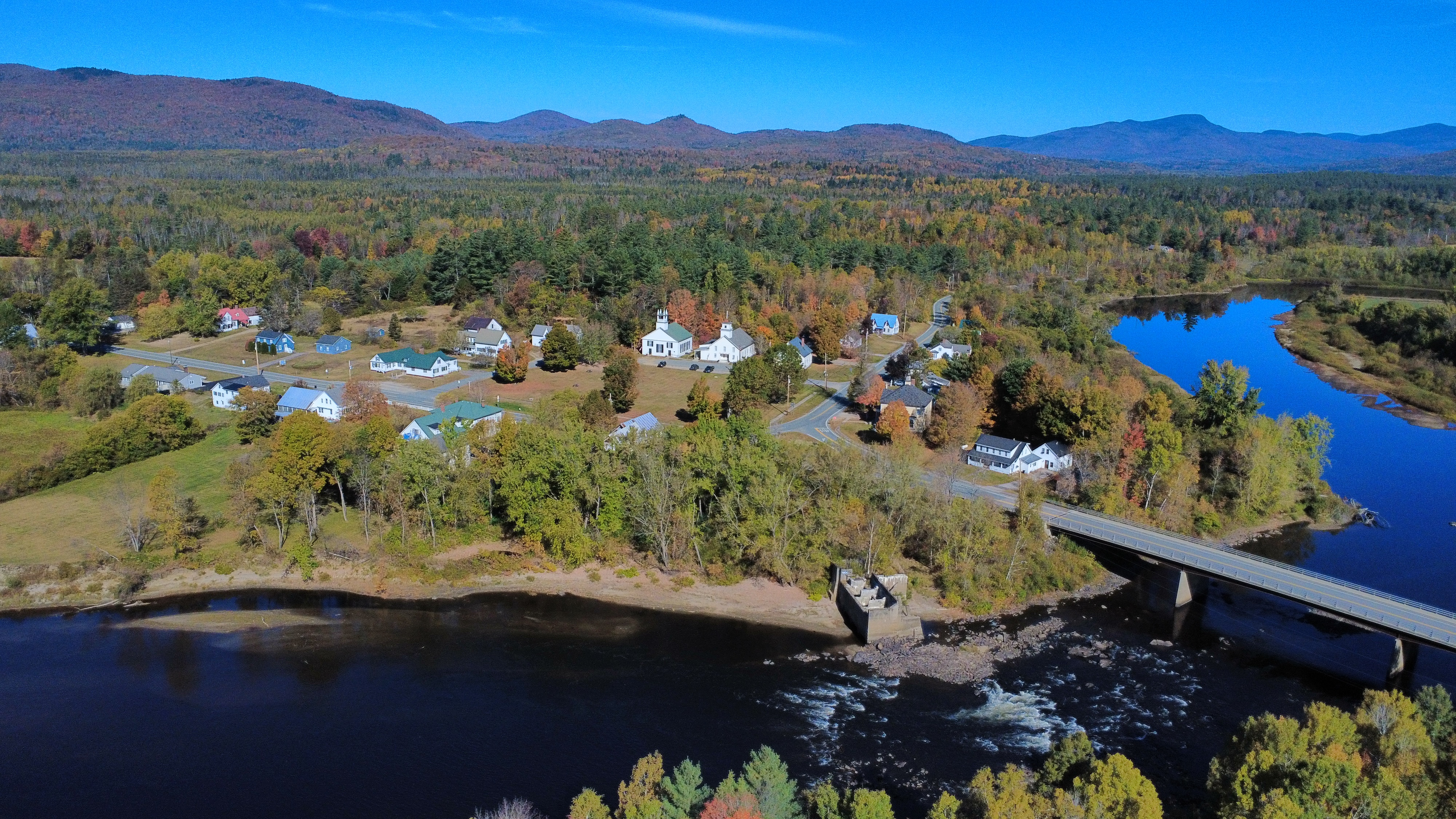
- Guildhall, VT, from the southeast

- Location in Essex County and the state of Vermont.
- Coordinates: 44°32′47″N 71°36′38″W
- Country: United States
- State: Vermont
- County: Essex

Area
  - Total: 33.1 sq mi (85.7 km^{2})
  - Land: 32.8 sq mi (84.9 km^{2})
  - Water: 0.31 sq mi (0.8 km^{2})
- Elevation: 1,257 ft (383 m)

Population (2020)
  - Total: 262
  - Density: 8.0/sq mi (3.1/km^{2})
- Time zone: UTC-5 (EST)
  - Summer (DST): UTC-4 (EDT)
- ZIP code: 05905
- Area code: 802
- FIPS code: 50-30775
- GNIS feature ID: 1462111
- Website: www.guildhallvt.org

Guildhall (/ˈɡɪlhɔːl/ GIL-hawl) is a town in and the shire town (county seat) of Essex County, Vermont, United States. As of the 2020 census, the population was 262. According to a large sign in the town center, it is the only town in the world so named. The name derives from a meeting house on the square called the Guildhall.

Guildhall is part of the Berlin, New Hampshire – Vermont Micropolitan Statistical Area.

== History ==
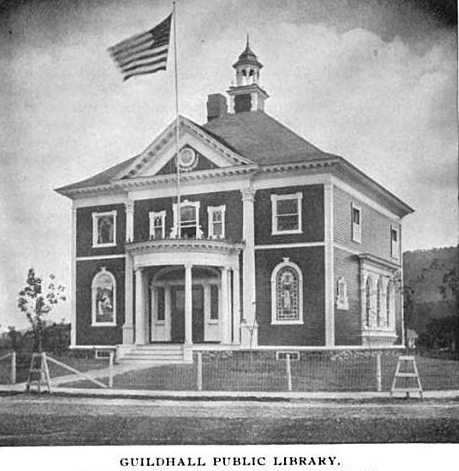
Guildhall Public Library, c. 1901

Guildhall was chartered by New Hampshire's colonial governor, Benning Wentworth, in 1761. Its grantees and original settlers were from Lancaster and Lunenburg, Massachusetts, and they named towns on opposite sides of the Connecticut River in New Hampshire and Vermont for their Massachusetts hometowns. The southern part of the original town of Lunenburg, Vermont was chartered as Lunenburg in 1763, while the northern portion was renamed Guildhall.

After Guildhall was chartered, a small group of settlers built temporary cabins and camps and began to clear the land. As the population began to grow, the first recorded town meeting took place in 1783. Guildhall is heavily wooded, as are several other towns in Essex County, and lumbering was once a major portion of the local economy. The Guildhall Village Historic District was listed on the National Register of Historic Places in 1980. The district includes Guildhall's village center and encompasses the central common and several nearby buildings.

== Geography ==
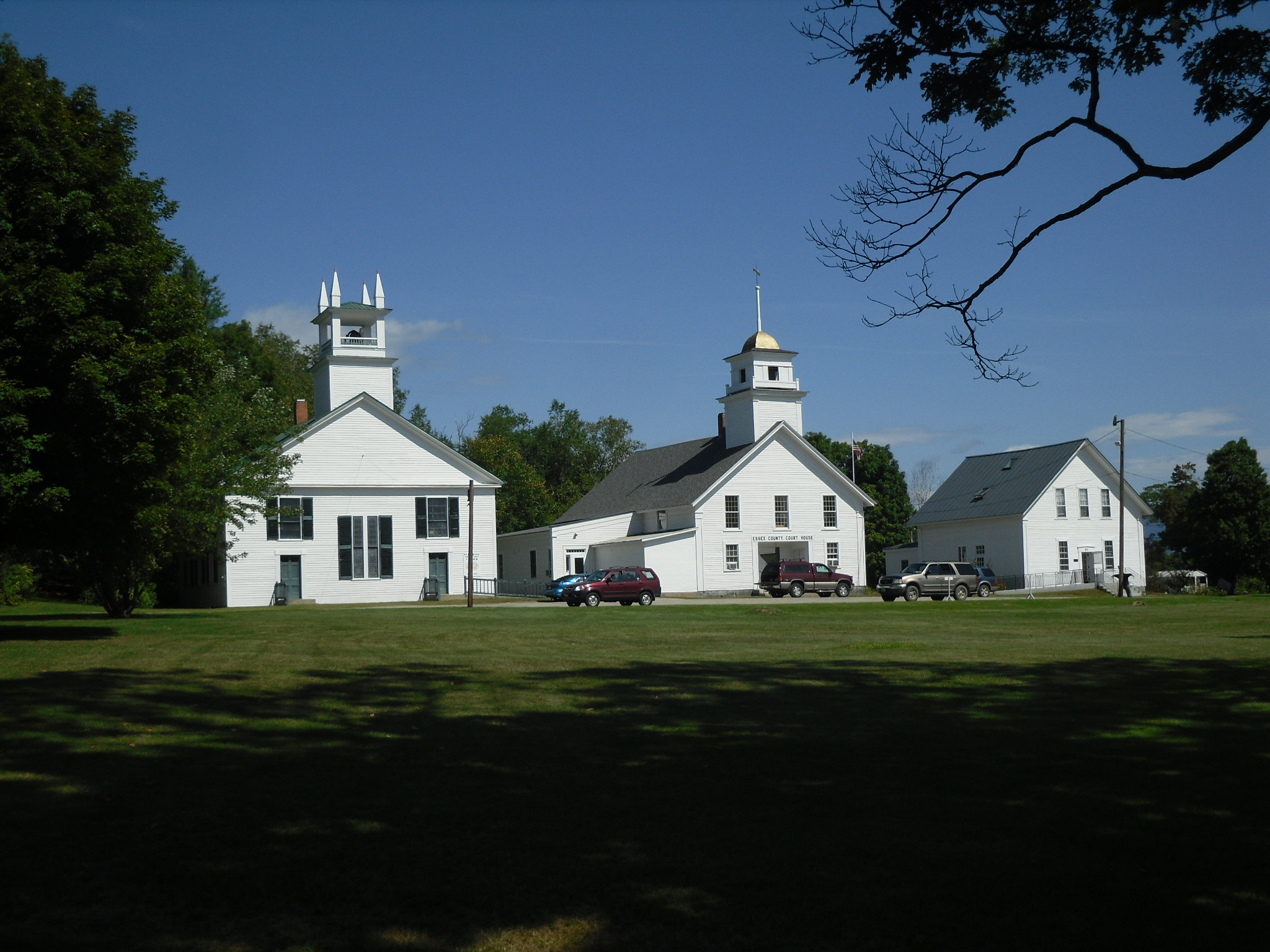
Guildhall village green

Guildhall is in northeastern Vermont, along the Connecticut River, the border between Vermont and New Hampshire. The town is bordered to the southwest by Lunenburg, to the northwest by Granby, and to the north by Maidstone, Vermont. To the southeast, across the Connecticut, are the towns of Northumberland and Lancaster, New Hampshire.

U.S. Route 2 passes through the southern corner of the town, leading west into Lunenburg and east across the Connecticut into Lancaster. Vermont Route 102 runs north from Route 2 and follows the Connecticut into Maidstone.

According to the United States Census Bureau, the town of Guildhall has a total area of 33.1 square miles (85.7 km^{2}), of which 32.8 square miles (84.9 km^{2}) is land and 0.3 square miles (0.8 km^{2}), or 0.94%, is water.

The highest point is Stone Mountain, in the western part of town, with an elevation of 2,736 feet (834 m).

=== Climate ===
This climatic region is typified by large seasonal temperature differences, with warm to hot (and often humid) summers and cold (sometimes severely cold) winters. According to the Köppen Climate Classification system, Guildhall has a humid continental climate, abbreviated "Dfb" on climate maps.

== Demographics ==
Historical population
Census	Pop.	Note	%±
1790	158		—
1800	296		87.3%
1810	544		83.8%
1820	529		−2.8%
1830	481		−9.1%
1840	470		−2.3%
1850	501		6.6%
1860	552		10.2%
1870	483		−12.5%
1880	558		15.5%
1890	511		−8.4%
1900	455		−11.0%
1910	445		−2.2%
1920	376		−15.5%
1930	351		−6.6%
1940	313		−10.8%
1950	270		−13.7%
1960	248		−8.1%
1970	169		−31.9%
1980	202		19.5%
1990	270		33.7%
2000	268		−0.7%
2010	261		−2.6%
2020	262		0.4%
U.S. Decennial Census

As of the census of 2000, there were 268 people, 106 households, and 76 families living in the town. The population density was 8.2 inhabitants per square mile (3.2/km^{2}). There were 151 housing units at an average density of 4.6 per square mile (1.8/km^{2}). The racial makeup of the town was 95.15% White, 0.37% Asian, 0.37% from other races, and 4.10% from two or more races. Hispanic or Latino of any race were 0.75% of the population.

There were 106 households, out of which 29.2% had children under the age of 18 living with them, 58.5% were couples living together and joined in either marriage or civil union, 4.7% had a female householder with no husband present, and 28.3% were non-families. 22.6% of all households were made up of individuals, and 15.1% had someone living alone who was 65 years of age or older. The average household size was 2.53 and the average family size was 2.96.

In the town, the population was spread out, with 24.3% under the age of 18, 6.7% from 18 to 24, 22.8% from 25 to 44, 25.0% from 45 to 64, and 21.3% who were 65 years of age or older. The median age was 43 years. For every 100 females, there were 88.7 males. For every 100 females age 18 and over, there were 86.2 males.

The median income for a household in the town was $31,750, and the median income for a family was $38,958. Males had a median income of $30,313 versus $23,438 for females. The per capita income for the town was $17,326. About 10.4% of families and 10.3% of the population were below the poverty line, including 6.3% of those under the age of eighteen and 22.0% of those 65 or over.

== Notable people ==
- Henry C. Bates, lieutenant governor of Vermont and federal judge, resided in Guildhall
- Everett Chamberlin Benton, Massachusetts business executive and politician, born in Guildhall
- Clem Bissonnette, member of the Vermont House of Representatives and mayor of Winooski, Vermont, resident of Guildhall
- George N. Dale, Vermont lieutenant governor, lived in Guildhall before moving to Island Pond
- Henry Willard Denison, diplomatic advisor to the Japanese government, born in Guildhall
- Samuel Read Hall, educator and clergyman, raised in Guildhall
- Janice L. Peaslee, member of the Vermont House of Representatives, resident of Guildhall
- John S. Wells, U.S. Senator from New Hampshire, lived in Guildhall
