= Warner's Grant, Vermont =

Unincorporated parcel of land in Essex County, Vermont, United States

Coordinates: 44°55′15″N 71°54′23″W

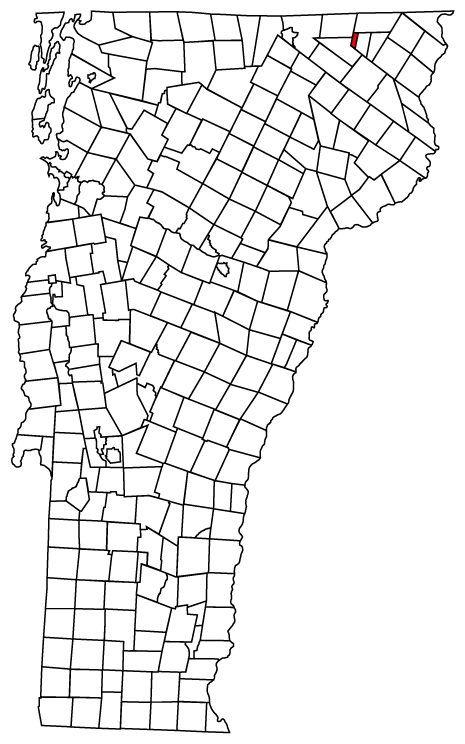
Warners Grant, Vermont

Warner's Grant is a gore located in Essex County, Vermont, United States. At the 2020 Census, the grant had a total population of 0.

Warner's Grant is named after Seth Warner, a leader of the Green Mountain Boys.

== Geography ==
According to the United States Census Bureau, the grant has a total area of 3.15 square miles (8.15 km^{2}), all land.

== Demographics ==
The population was zero at the 2020 census. The gore has been uninhabited since at least 1970.

== Proper name ==
Sources are inconsistent on whether the name is, properly, Warner's Grant or Warners Grant (i.e., with the apostrophe or without), and some sources list it as Warner's Gore. The likely reason is the standard removal of the apostrophe from nearly all US place names by the U.S. Board of Geographic Names on its inception in 1890.

The original charter (as reproduced in State Papers of Vermont, Volume Two: Charters Granted by the State of Vermont, VT Secretary of State, 1922, pp 206–7) merely mentions the boundaries of the tract of land. The land was granted to Hester Warner, the widow of Col. Seth Warner (one of the leaders of the Green Mountain Boys), and Seth Warner's other heirs. While the name's origin, honoring Seth Warner, is clear, the charter does nothing to specify precise usage.

State Papers of Vermont, Volume One: Index to the Papers of the Surveyors-General (VT Secretary of State, 1918) lists it as "Warner's Grant or Warner's Gore" (p. 154).

The Vermont Statutes mention the grant in at least three places, each time using the term Warner's Grant (Title 17, Chapter 34, Section 1893; T. 24, Ch. 1, Sec. 6; and T. 24, Ch. 117, Sec. 4341(e)).

The Gazetteer of Caledonia and Essex Counties, VT, 1764-1887 (Hamilton Child, 1887) lists the name as Warner's Grant (p. 490).

However, The Vermont Road Atlas and Guide (Northern Cartographic, 1989) uses Warners Grant (p. 63), as do Vermont Place-Names: Footprints of History by Esther M. Swift (The Stephen Greene Press, 1977, pp 220–2), and the Vermont Atlas and Gazetteer (Delorme, 9th ed., 1996, p. 55).
