= Lewis, Vermont =

- Town
- Location in Essex County and the state of Vermont
- Coordinates: 44°51′58″N 71°44′55″W
- Country: United States
- State: Vermont

Government
  - Type: Unincorporated Town

Area
  - Total: 39.7 sq mi (103 km^{2})
  - Land: 39.6 sq mi (103 km^{2})
  - Water: 0.1 sq mi (0.26 km^{2})
- Elevation: 1,421 ft (433 m)

Population (2020)
  - Total: 2
  - Density: 0.26/sq mi (0.1/km^{2})
- Time zone: UTC-5 (EST)
  - Summer (DST): UTC-4 (EDT)
- ZIP code: 05846 (Island Pond)
- GNIS feature ID: 1462134

Lewis is a town in Essex County, Vermont, United States. The town was named for landholders Nathan, Sevignior, and Timothy Lewis. Although incorporated by the state, the town was never formally organized, since it never gained a sufficiently large permanent population. For most of the 20th century, the town had a total population of zero. It reported a population of 2 at the 2020 census; however it is possible due to the town sharing a census block with nearby towns and gores and the introduction of differential privacy for the 2020 census, that the actual population remained at 0. Indeed, 100% of the town's land that is not federally protected is owned by a single logging company, Weyerhaeuser. The town's affairs are handled by the Unified Towns & Gores Of Essex County.

== Geography ==
According to the United States Census Bureau, the town has a total area of 39.7 square miles (103 km^{2}), of which 39.6 square miles (103 km^{2}) is land and 0.1 square miles (0.26 km^{2}) is water, for a total of 0.25% water.

== Demographics ==
Historical population
Census	Pop.	Note	%±
1900	8		—
2000	0		—
2010	0		—
2020	2		—
U.S. Decennial Census
