= Vermont Route 114 =

State highway in northeastern Vermont, US

Vermont Route 114
- VT 114 highlighted in red

Route information
- Maintained by VTrans
- Length: 53.094 mi (85.447 km)

Major junctions
- South end: US 5 / VT 122 in Lyndon
- VT 105 in Brighton
- North end: Main Street at Stewartstown, NH

Location
- Country: United States
- State: Vermont
- Counties: Caledonia, Essex, Orleans

Highway system
- State highways in Vermont
← VT 113A		→ VT 115
← VT 140	VT 141	→ VT 142
← VT 144	VT 147	→ VT 149

Vermont Route 114 (VT 114) is a 53.094-mile-long (85.447 km) north–south state highway in northeastern Vermont in the United States. It runs northward from U.S. Route 5 (US 5) in Lyndon until nearing the Canada–United States border in the town of Norton; thereafter, the road continues east to the New Hampshire state line in Canaan. The vast majority of VT 114 is situated within Essex County; however, the route also passes through small, isolated portions of Caledonia and Orleans Counties.

Moose are most often encountered on four roads in Vermont, of which this is one. They are seen from East Burke to Canaan.

== Route description ==
VT 114 begins at an intersection with US 5 and VT 122 in the town of Lyndon in northern Caledonia County. US 5 heads south as Main Street through the unincorporated village of Lyndonville and north as Lynburke Road toward West Burke. VT 122 heads west along Stevens Loop toward a junction with Interstate 91 and the town of Wheelock. VT 114 heads northeast along East Burke Road. The highway begins just north of the Passumpsic River, crosses to the east side of the river, then crosses the East Branch of the river just to the south of the confluence of the East and West branches to form the main river. The highway follows the valley of the river to the west of Burke Mountain. VT 114 crosses the East Branch again before entering the town of Burke. In the hamlet of East Burke, the highway passes to the west of Burke Mountain Ski Area. VT 114 briefly passes through the Essex County town of East Haven, then through the town of Newark in Caledonia County, where the highway is known as Island Pond Road.

VT 114 re-enters Essex County in the town of Brighton, where it is known as East Haven Road. Just after entering the town, the highway crosses the watershed divide between the source of the East Branch of the Passumpsic River and the source of Oswegatchie Brook. VT 114 follows the brook to its confluence with the Clyde River next to the highways junction with VT 105 (Charleston Road). The two highways head east along Charleston Road into the village of Island Pond, which lies at the northern end of the eponymous lake. The highways follow Derby Street and Cross Street to the center of town, where the routes split. VT 105 heads east along East Brighton Road and VT 114 heads northwest along Railroad Street and Norton Road parallel to a rail line and the Pherrins River. The highway meets the southern end of VT 111 just south of the Essex–Orleans county line, then continues north through the Orleans County town of Morgan.

VT 114 re-enters Essex County in Warren's Gore, where the highway crosses the watershed divide between the source of the Pherrins River and the source of the Coaticook River at Norton Pond. The highway continues north into the town of Norton. VT 114 intersects VT 147 in the hamlet of Norton; VT 147 is a very short route that connects with Quebec Route 147 at the Canada–United States border opposite Stanhope, Quebec. The highway veers east away from the river and rail line and parallels the international border east, briefly passing through the unorganized town of Averill north of Great Averill Pond. The highway enters the town of Canaan, the northeasternmost town in Vermont, and passes by Wallace Pond, which straddles the international border. VT 114 intersects VT 141, a short route that connects to Quebec Route 141 at the Hereford border crossing. The highway veers southeast away from the border to the village of Canaan, where the route follows Gale Street and intersects VT 102 (Park Street) and VT 253 (Christian Hill Road). VT 102 heads south toward Lemington and VT 253 runs northeast to Beecher Falls. VT 114 reaches its eastern terminus at a bridge across the Connecticut River at the Vermont–New Hampshire state line. The road continues as unnumbered Main Street in the village of West Stewartstown, which leads to US 3.

== Major intersections ==
County	Location	mi	km	Destinations	Notes
Caledonia	Lyndon	0.000	0.000	US 5 / VT 122 north – Wheelock, Lyndonville, West Burke	Southern terminus; southern terminus of VT 122
Essex	Brighton	20.980	33.764	VT 105 west – West Charleston, Derby Center	Southern end of concurrency with VT 105
Essex	Brighton	23.088	37.157	VT 105 east – Island Pond, Bloomfield	Northern end of concurrency with VT 105; census-designated place of Island Pond
Essex	Brighton	25.843	41.590	VT 111 west	Eastern terminus of VT 111
Orleans	No major junctions				
Essex	Norton	39.284	63.221	VT 147 – Canada	
Essex	Canaan	51.800	83.364	VT 141 – Hereford Que, Coaticook Que	
Essex	Canaan	52.913	85.155	VT 102 south – Bloomfield VT 253 north – East Hereford Que	Northern terminus of VT 102; southern terminus of VT 253
Essex	Canaan	53.094	85.447	Main Street – Colebrook N.H., W. Stewartstown N.H.	Continuation into New Hampshire
1.000 mi = 1.609 km; 1.000 km = 0.621 mi: Concurrency terminus

== Related routes ==
=== Vermont Route 141 ===
Vermont Route 141
- Location: Canaan
- Length: 0.493 mi (793 m)
- Existed: May 1, 1960–present

Vermont Route 141 (VT 141) is a 0.493-mile-long (0.793 km) highway entirely in the town of Canaan that runs from VT 114 north to the Canada–United States border. The highway provides access to the Canaan–Hereford Road Border Crossing. The highway continues north from the border crossing as Quebec Route 141 toward Saint-Herménégilde and Coaticook in Quebec's Coaticook Regional County Municipality.

=== Vermont Route 147 ===
Vermont Route 147
- Location: Norton
- Length: 0.145 mi (233 m)

Vermont Route 147 (VT 147) is a 0.145-mile-long (0.233 km) highway entirely in the town of Norton that runs from VT 114 north to the Canada–United States border. The highway provides access to the Norton–Stanhope Border Crossing. The highway continues north from the border crossing as Quebec Route 147 toward Stanhope and Coaticook in Quebec's Coaticook Regional County Municipality.
