= East Branch Mohawk River (New Hampshire) =

- Location within New Hampshire Location within the United States

Location
- Country: United States
- State: New Hampshire
- County: Coos
- Towns: Stewartstown, Colebrook

Physical characteristics
- Source: Coleman State Park
  - location: Stewartstown
  - coordinates: 44°56′21″N 71°19′56″W
  - elevation: 2,100 ft (640 m)
- Mouth: West Branch Mohawk River
  - location: Colebrook (Upper Kidderville)
  - coordinates: 44°53′9″N 71°21′42″W
  - elevation: 1,430 ft (440 m)
- Length: 4.6 mi (7.4 km)

The East Branch of the Mohawk River is a 4.6-mile-long (7.4 km) river in northern New Hampshire in the United States. It is a tributary of the West Branch Mohawk River and in turn the Mohawk River, which flows west to the Connecticut River, which in turn flows south to Long Island Sound, an arm of the Atlantic Ocean.

The East Branch rises in Coleman State Park in Stewartstown, New Hampshire, just south of Little Diamond Pond. The river flows south through forests and fields, joining the West Branch at the village of Upper Kidderville in the town of Colebrook.

== See also ==
- List of New Hampshire rivers
