= West Branch Mohawk River (New Hampshire) =

- Location within New Hampshire Location within the United States

Location
- Country: United States
- State: New Hampshire
- County: Coos
- Towns: Stewartstown, Colebrook

Physical characteristics
- Source
  - location: Stewartstown
  - coordinates: 44°56′32″N 71°23′6″W
  - elevation: 1,670 ft (510 m)
- Mouth: Mohawk River
  - location: Kidderville
  - coordinates: 44°52′34″N 71°22′13″W
  - elevation: 1,310 ft (400 m)
- Length: 5.5 mi (8.9 km)

Basin features
- Tributaries
  - left: East Branch

The West Branch of the Mohawk River is a 5.5-mile-long (8.9 km) river in northern New Hampshire in the United States. It is a tributary of the Mohawk River, which flows west to the Connecticut River, which in turn flows south to Long Island Sound, an arm of the Atlantic Ocean.

The West Branch rises in Stewartstown, New Hampshire, between Mudget Mountain to the north and Lovering Mountain to the south. The river flows south and is joined by the East Branch at the village of Upper Kidderville in the town of Colebrook. The West Branch continues south and joins the Mohawk River in Kidderville, just north of New Hampshire Route 26.

== See also ==
- List of New Hampshire rivers
