= Vermont Route 253 =

State highway in Essex County, Vermont, US

Vermont Route 253
- VT 253 highlighted in red

Route information
- Maintained by VTrans
- Length: 2.159 mi (3.475 km)
- Existed: June 29, 1949–present

Major junctions
- South end: VT 102 / VT 114 in Canaan
- North end: R-253 at the Canadian border in Beecher Falls

Location
- Country: United States
- State: Vermont
- Counties: Essex

Highway system
- State highways in Vermont
| ← VT 244 | → VT 279 |

Vermont Route 253 (VT 253) is a 2.159-mile-long (3.475 km) state highway located entirely within the town of Canaan in Essex County, Vermont, in the United States. It extends from a junction with VT 102 and VT 114 to the Canadian border, where it continues into Quebec as Route 253. VT 253 is known in Canaan as Christian Hill.

== Route description ==
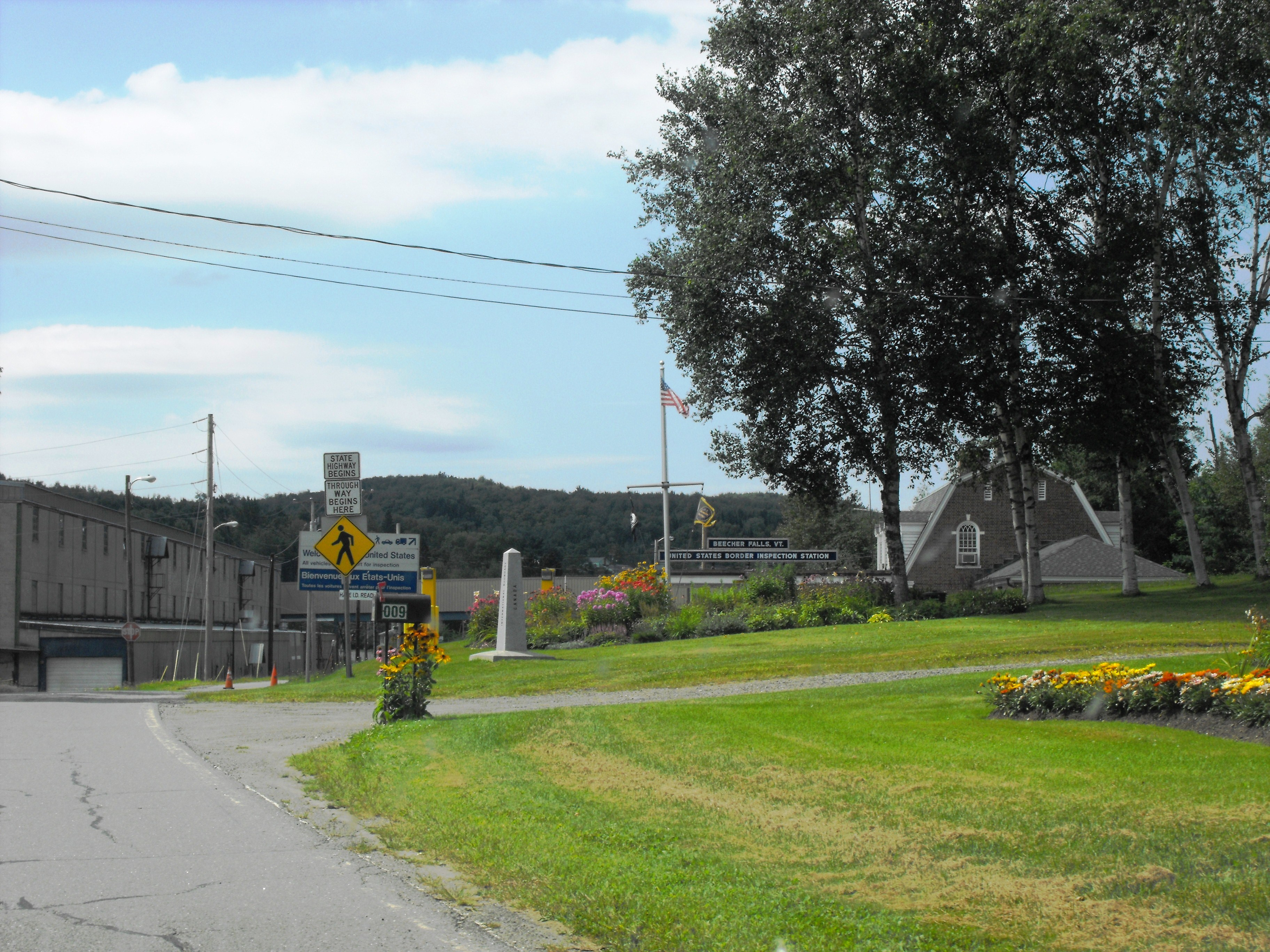
VT 253 southbound approaching the United States Customs station in Beecher Falls

VT 253 begins at an intersection with VT 114 (Gale Street) and VT 102 in the town of Canaan near the New Hampshire state line. VT 253 is a northern continuation of VT 102, which also ends at the intersection with VT 114. VT 253 runs north along Christian Hill, passing the local cemetery near Kingsley Road. The route, a two-lane residential road, leaves downtown Canaan, passing a dam on the Connecticut River, which parallels VT 253. When nearby Power House Road merges in, VT 253 runs alongside the river, crossing a former railroad grade, which parallels along the northern side of the highway. Winding along the riverside across from US 3 in New Hampshire, the route turns away in short spurts from the railroad grade, passing some homes.

In the northern section of Canaan, VT 253 turns eastward along the river and enters Beecher Falls, reaching a four-way junction with a bridge over the Connecticut River. The bridge connects VT 253 and US 3. VT 253 turns north on the bridge's right-of-way, passing some homes before reaching the Beecher Falls–East Hereford Border Crossing. North of the border crossing, VT 253 runs north for a short distance, reaching the Quebec provincial line, where it continues north as Route 253.

== Major intersections ==
The entire route is in Canaan, Essex County.

| mi | km | Destinations | Notes |
|---|---|---|---|
| 0.000 | 0.000 | VT 102 south – Bloomfield / VT 114 (Gale Street) to US 3 – West Stewartstown NH, Colebrook NH, Norton | Southern terminus; northern terminus of VT 102 |
| 2.159 | 3.475 | R-253 | Beecher Falls–East Hereford Border Crossing; continuation into Quebec |
1.000 mi = 1.609 km; 1.000 km = 0.621 mi
