= Beecher Falls–East Hereford Border Crossing =

Canada–United States border crossing

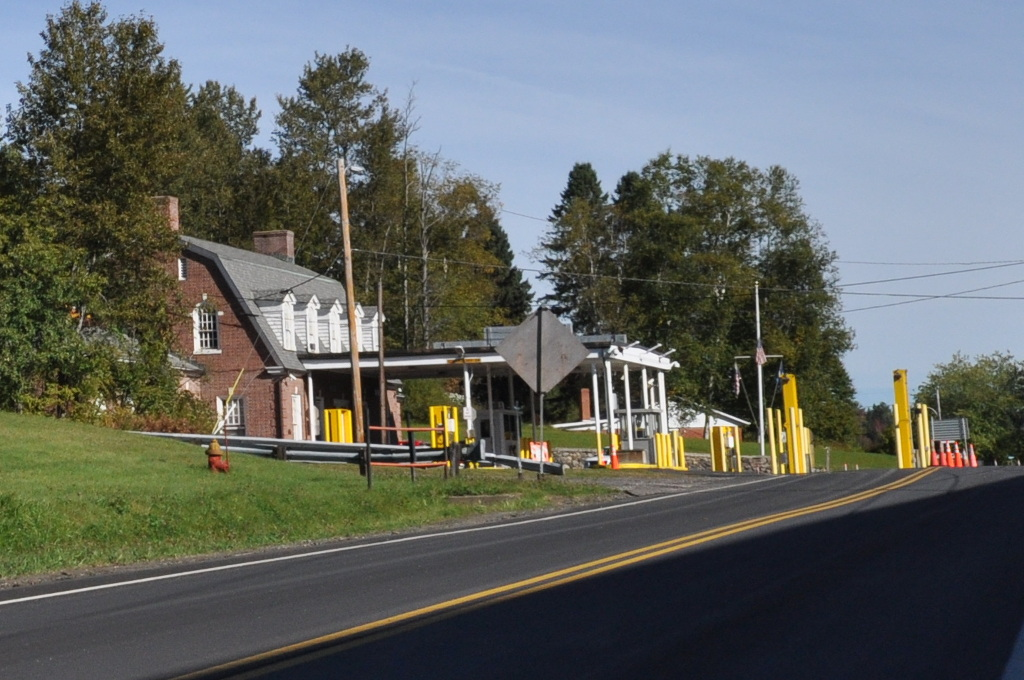
- Beecher Falls Vermont Border Inspection Station as seen in 2016

Location
- Country: United States; Canada
- Location: VT 253 / R-253; US Port: 1429 VT Route 253S, Beecher Falls, Vermont 05902; Canadian Port: 26 Route 253, East Hereford, Quebec J1B 1SO
- Coordinates: 45.013376°N 71.505353°W

Details
- Opened: 1926

Website
- Official Canadian website; Official US website
- U.S. Inspection Station-Beecher Falls, Vermont
- U.S. National Register of Historic Places
- MPS: U.S. Border Inspection Stations MPS
- NRHP reference No.: 14000602
- Added to NRHP: September 10, 2014

The Beecher Falls–East Hereford Border Crossing connects the municipality of East Hereford, Quebec, and the village of Beecher Falls, Vermont, on the Canada–United States border. It is reached by Vermont Route 253 on the American side and by Quebec Route 253 on the Canadian side. Both the Canadian and the U.S. stations are open 24 hours a day. The Canadian station is open for commercial traffic on a limited basis. The American station facility, built in the 1930s, was listed on the National Register of Historic Places in 2014.

== Setting ==
The Canada–United States border between the province of Quebec and the state of Vermont is basically a straight east–west line, whose eastern end is at Halls Stream, a south-flowing tributary of the Connecticut River. The Vermont village of Beecher Falls is located just west of the mouth of Halls Stream; its northernmost business, a manufacturing facility of the Ethan Allen Furniture Company, directly abuts the border between the roadway and Halls Stream. The Quebec side of the border is rural, with woods and fields in the immediate vicinity.

The crossing point is formed by the junction of Vermont Route 253 and Quebec Route 253. It is one of 15 crossings in Vermont and is three miles (4.8 km) from the Canaan–Hereford Road Border Crossing. A United States Border Patrol regional headquarters is located between the two, along Vermont Route 114. The Border Patrol lists both the Canaan crossing ("Canaan Station") and the Pittsburg–Chartierville Border Crossing ("Pittsburg Station") in New Hampshire as facilities of the Beecher Falls port of entry.

A line house once stood on the boundary line at this crossing. The house was used during the Prohibition era, as Americans flocked to the border for drinks. In the 1920s, there were three bridges that crossed Halls Stream between Quebec and New Hampshire. At the time, there was no American customs presence at these crossings and travelers were expected to proceed to Beecher Falls to report. All three bridges were destroyed in 1929, in a flood.

== Canadian station ==
The original East Hereford border station was built in the 1930s. It also referred to as "Comins Crossing", Comins Mills being a hamlet within East Hereford. The station was a single-story white hip-roofed wooden structure with an integrated single-story canopy. This border station style was used frequently at many border crossings built in this era. This building was replaced with the current facility of a similar design in 1960.

== U.S. station ==
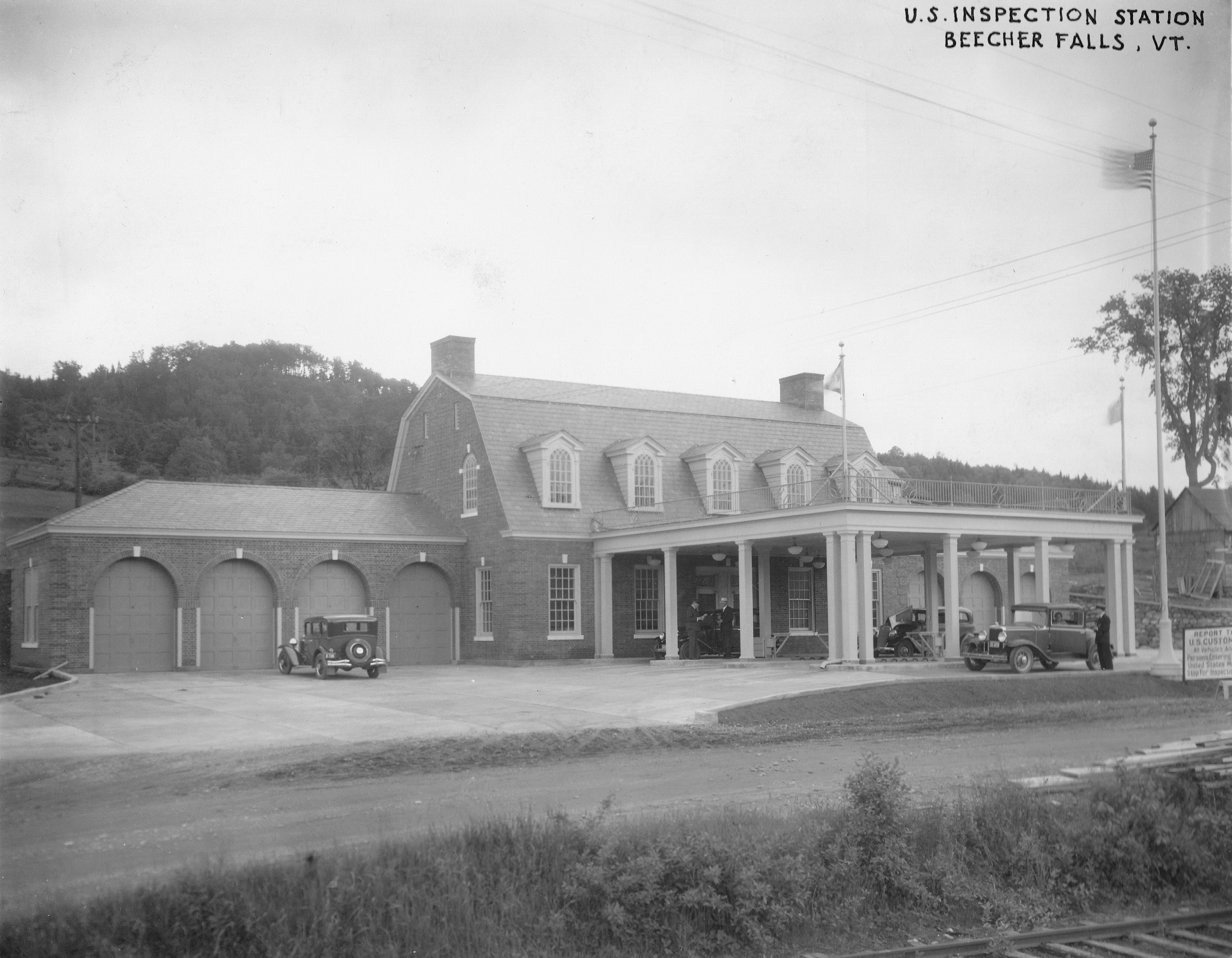
U.S. Border Station at Beecher Falls, Vermont, as seen in 1933

The U.S. station is located abutting the border on the west side of Vermont Route 253, opposite the Ethan Allen plant. Its main building is a 1 1/2 story brick Georgian Revival building, with a dormered gambrel roof and end chimneys. A metal porte cochère extends across two lanes to shelter vehicles as they are processed. The front facade of the building is five bays wide, with a central entrance flanked by sash windows. Single-story wings, formerly housing four bays of inspection garages, extend to either side of the main block. Two of the left-side bays have been enclosed, and now house restroom facilities. The interior of the main block is symmetrically divided into areas for processing customs on one side and immigration on the other, with additional office space and holding cells on the attic level.

The station was built in 1932, as part of a general U.S. government program to improve border security. This program was prompted by changes in immigration law resulting in increased illegal immigration, as well as the increased use of the automobile for personal travel and an increase in smuggling occasioned by Prohibition in the 1920s. The station is a little-altered version of one of several standardized designs produced by the United States Treasury Department Architect as part of the program.

== See also ==
- List of Canada–United States border crossings
- National Register of Historic Places listings in Essex County, Vermont
