= Monadnock Mountain (Vermont) =

Mountain in Vermont, United States

Highest point
- Elevation: 3,148 ft (960 m)
- Prominence: 1,528 ft (466 m)
- Isolation: 5.91 mi (9.51 km)
- Coordinates: 44°53′51″N 71°32′40″W

Geography
- Location: Essex County, Vermont, U.S.
- Topo map: USGS Monadnock Mountain

Monadnock Mountain, also called Mount Monadnock, is an inselberg located in the town of Lemington in the Northeast Kingdom region of the U.S. state of Vermont. The mountain overlooks the Connecticut River and the town of Colebrook, New Hampshire, to the east. At its highest point, the mountain is 3,148 ft (960 m) high. At the summit, an old fire tower offers excellent views of both Vermont and New Hampshire. On a clear day, the view extends as far east as Maine and as far north as Quebec.

The Monadnock Mountain Trail ascends the eastern slope of the mountain. The trailhead is adjacent to Vermont Route 102, 7.7 miles (12.4 km) south of Canaan and 13 miles (21 km) north of Bloomfield. The hike from the trailhead to the summit is 2.5 miles (4.0 km) with a gain in elevation of 2,130 ft (650 m).

== Norton Mine ==
The Norton Mine, (located in Lemington, VT, not Norton, VT) is an abandoned gold mine located near the base of the mountain. It is accessible from the trail along Route 102, turning southwest at 1400' elevation.

The entrance is currently blocked by boulders.

== Climate ==
Mount Monadnock has a humid continental climate (Köppen Dfb) with subarctic climate (Köppen Dfc) characteristics. There is no weather station, but this climate table contains interpolated data.

Climate data for Monadnock Mountain (VT) 44.8997 N, 71.5499 W, Elevation: 2,871 ft (875 m) (1991–2020 normals)
Month	Jan	Feb	Mar	Apr	May	Jun	Jul	Aug	Sep	Oct	Nov	Dec	Year
Mean daily maximum °F (°C)	19.7 (−6.8)	22.0 (−5.6)	30.5 (−0.8)	44.9 (7.2)	58.4 (14.7)	67.1 (19.5)	71.5 (21.9)	70.2 (21.2)	63.6 (17.6)	50.3 (10.2)	36.2 (2.3)	26.0 (−3.3)	46.7 (8.2)
Daily mean °F (°C)	10.3 (−12.1)	12.1 (−11.1)	20.8 (−6.2)	35.2 (1.8)	47.4 (8.6)	56.5 (13.6)	61.0 (16.1)	59.6 (15.3)	52.9 (11.6)	41.1 (5.1)	29.0 (−1.7)	18.0 (−7.8)	37.0 (2.8)
Mean daily minimum °F (°C)	0.9 (−17.3)	2.3 (−16.5)	11.1 (−11.6)	25.5 (−3.6)	36.5 (2.5)	46.0 (7.8)	50.6 (10.3)	49.0 (9.4)	42.1 (5.6)	31.8 (−0.1)	21.7 (−5.7)	10.0 (−12.2)	27.3 (−2.6)
Average precipitation inches (mm)	4.02 (102)	3.24 (82)	4.04 (103)	4.09 (104)	4.64 (118)	5.69 (145)	5.16 (131)	5.46 (139)	4.67 (119)	5.01 (127)	4.12 (105)	4.41 (112)	54.55 (1,387)
Source: PRISM Climate Group

== See also ==
- List of mountains in Vermont
