= Vermont Route 102 =

State highway in Essex County, Vermont, US

Vermont Route 102
- Deputy Ruby Rainault Memorial Highway
- VT 102 highlighted in red

Route information
- Maintained by VTrans
- Length: 43.755 mi (70.417 km)

Major junctions
- South end: US 2 in Guildhall
- North end: VT 114 / VT 253 in Canaan

Location
- Country: United States
- State: Vermont
- Counties: Essex

Highway system
- State highways in Vermont
← VT 101	→ VT 103

Vermont Route 102 (VT 102) is a north–south state highway in Essex County, Vermont, in the United States. It follows the west bank of the Connecticut River and parallels U.S. Route 3 (US 3), which is routed along the river's east bank in New Hampshire. The southern terminus of the route is at US 2 in Guildhall. Its northern terminus is at VT 114 and VT 253 in Canaan. VT 102 is 43.755 miles (70.417 km) long and connects to six highways that traverse the Connecticut River.

== Route description ==
VT 102 begins at an intersection with US 2 on the west bank of the Connecticut River in Guildhall. US 2 heads east across the river into Lancaster, New Hampshire; however, VT 102 heads north along the waterway's western bank. It heads northwest into the village of Guildhall, then veers due east to access Guildhall Road, a local highway connecting VT 102 to US 3 across the river in Northumberland, New Hampshire. VT 102 turns northward at this junction, mirroring the curves in the routing of the Connecticut River.

The highway continues several miles to the north to the town of Maidstone, where another local river crossing, Lamoreaux Road, runs eastward to US 3 in the New Hampshire town of Stratford. VT 102 continues northward for several more miles into the town of Bloomfield, where it meets VT 105. VT 105 westbound traverses the northern part of the state towards the cities of Newport and St. Albans, while VT 105 eastbound ends at the river crossing to North Stratford, New Hampshire, and continues as an unnumbered road to US 3.

After the intersection with VT 105, VT 102 turns to the northeast, continuing to parallel the western riverbank to Lemington. It is north of town where VT 102 meets the shortest signed route in the state, VT 26. VT 26 runs for approximately 69 feet (21 m) to the New Hampshire state line (delimited by the Connecticut River), where it continues as New Hampshire Route 26 in Colebrook. VT 102 turns back to the north and continues into the town of Canaan, where it comes to an end at an intersection with VT 114 and VT 253. VT 114 westbound straddles the border with Canada before curving south toward Interstate 91; meanwhile, VT 114 eastbound continues for about 0.25 miles (0.40 km) to the river, where it continues to US 3 in Stewartstown, New Hampshire, as a local road. VT 253, meanwhile, is a northward continuation of VT 102 along the riverbank to the Canadian border.

== Major intersections ==
The entire route is in Essex County.

Location	mi	km	Destinations	Notes
Guildhall	0.000	0.000	US 2 – Lunenburg, St. Johnsbury, Lancaster NH	Southern terminus
Bloomfield	23.002	37.018	VT 105 to US 3 – Lemington, Island Pond, North Stratford NH	
Lemington	35.898	57.772	VT 26 east to US 3 – Colebrook NH	Western terminus of VT 26
Canaan	43.755	70.417	VT 114 / VT 253 north to US 3 – Norton, Montreal Que., Colebrook NH, West Stewartstown NH	Northern terminus; southern terminus of VT 253
1.000 mi = 1.609 km; 1.000 km = 0.621 mi
