= Columbia Bridge =

Columbia Bridge may refer to:

- Columbia Railroad Bridge in Philadelphia, Pennsylvania
- Columbia Bridge (New Hampshire) over the Connecticut River between Columbia, New Hampshire and Lemington, Vermont
