= NH 26 =

NH 26 may refer to:

- National Highway 26 (India)
- New Hampshire Route 26, United States
