= New Hampshire Route 145 =

State highway in Coös County, New Hampshire, US

New Hampshire Route 145

Route information
- Maintained by NHDOT
- Length: 13.133 mi (21.136 km)

Major junctions
- South end: US 3 in Colebrook
- North end: US 3 in Pittsburg

Location
- Country: United States
- State: New Hampshire
- Counties: Coös

Highway system
- New Hampshire Highway System; Interstate; US; State; Turnpikes
← NH 142	→ NH 149

New Hampshire Route 145 (abbreviated NH 145) is a 13.133-mile-long (21.136 km) north–south state highway in northern Coös County in the Great North Woods Region of New Hampshire. The highway runs between intersections with U.S. Route 3 (US 3) in Colebrook and Pittsburg, taking a more direct route than US 3, which closely follows the Connecticut River and takes a longer, more circuitous route between the two towns. NH 145 serves the towns of Stewartstown and Clarksville.

== Route description ==
NH 145 begins at US 3 (Main Street) just north of the U.S. Highway's bridge across the Mohawk River in the town center of Colebrook. The two-lane highway heads northeast out of the town center along Park Street. NH 145 follows Beaver Brook and its North Branch, passing Beaver Brook Falls Wayside, to its headwaters at Stewartstown Hollow in the town of Stewartstown, where the route follows Hollow Road. A New Hampshire historical marker there (number 47) notes the nearby gravesite of Metallak, "The Lone Indian of the Magalloway". The highway descends to Cedar Brook and crosses Bishop Brook before ascending out of that valley and entering the town of Clarksville. NH 145 crosses Pond Brook, passes another historical marker (number 155) denoting the 45th parallel north, and passes through the village of Clarksville. North of there, the highway descends to and crosses the Connecticut River into the town of Pittsburg. There, NH 145 follows Mill Street a short distance to its northern terminus at US 3 (Main Street).

== Major intersections ==
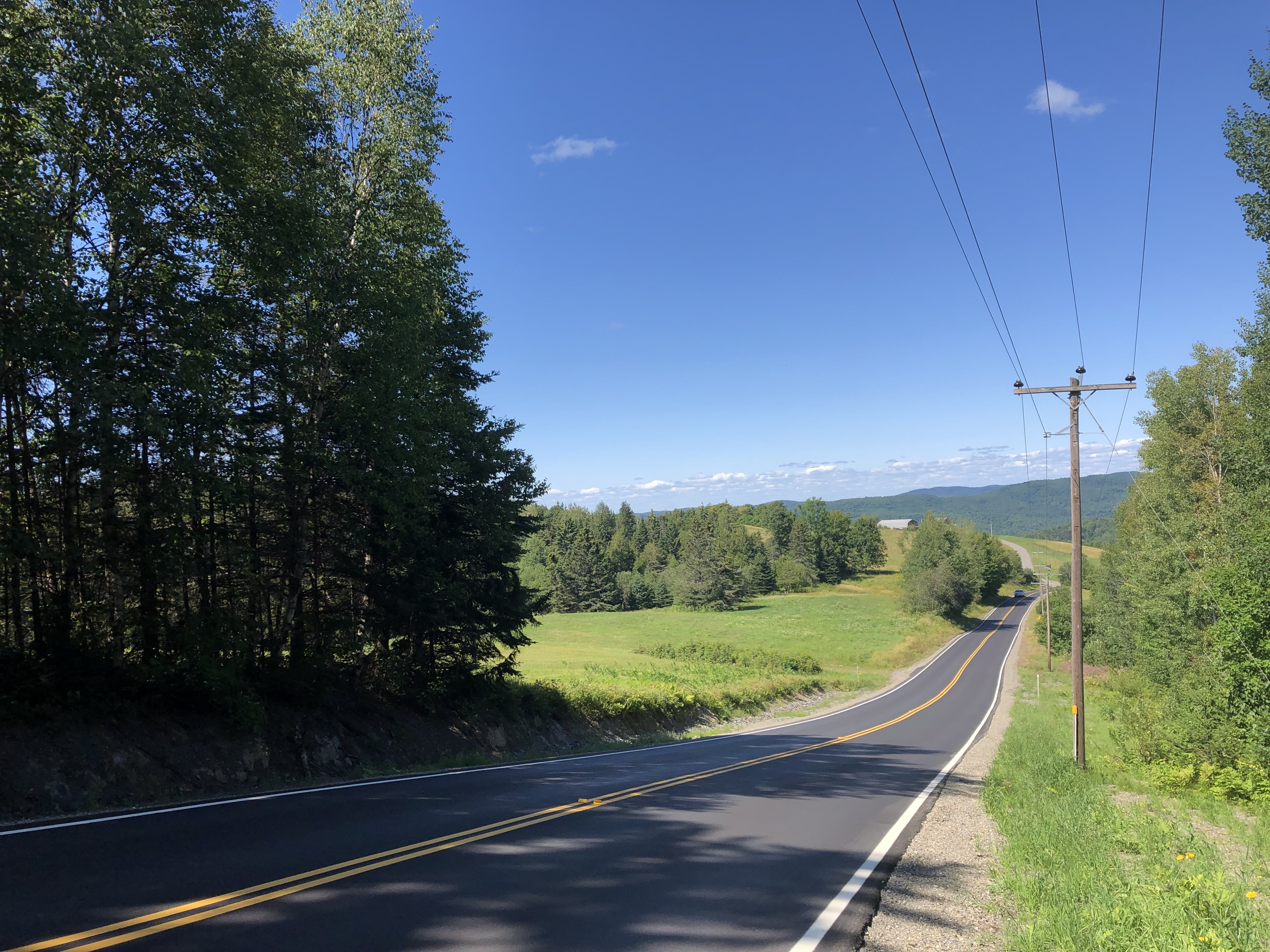
NH 145, looking north in Clarksville

The entire route is in Coös County.

Location	mi	km	Destinations	Notes
Colebrook	0.000	0.000	US 3 (Main Street) – Lancaster	Southern terminus
Pittsburg	13.133	21.136	US 3 (Main Street) – Stewartstown, Connecticut Lakes	Northern terminus
1.000 mi = 1.609 km; 1.000 km = 0.621 mi
