= Halls Stream =

Waterway on the border of the United States and Canada

Halls Stream Rivière Hall (in Quebec)
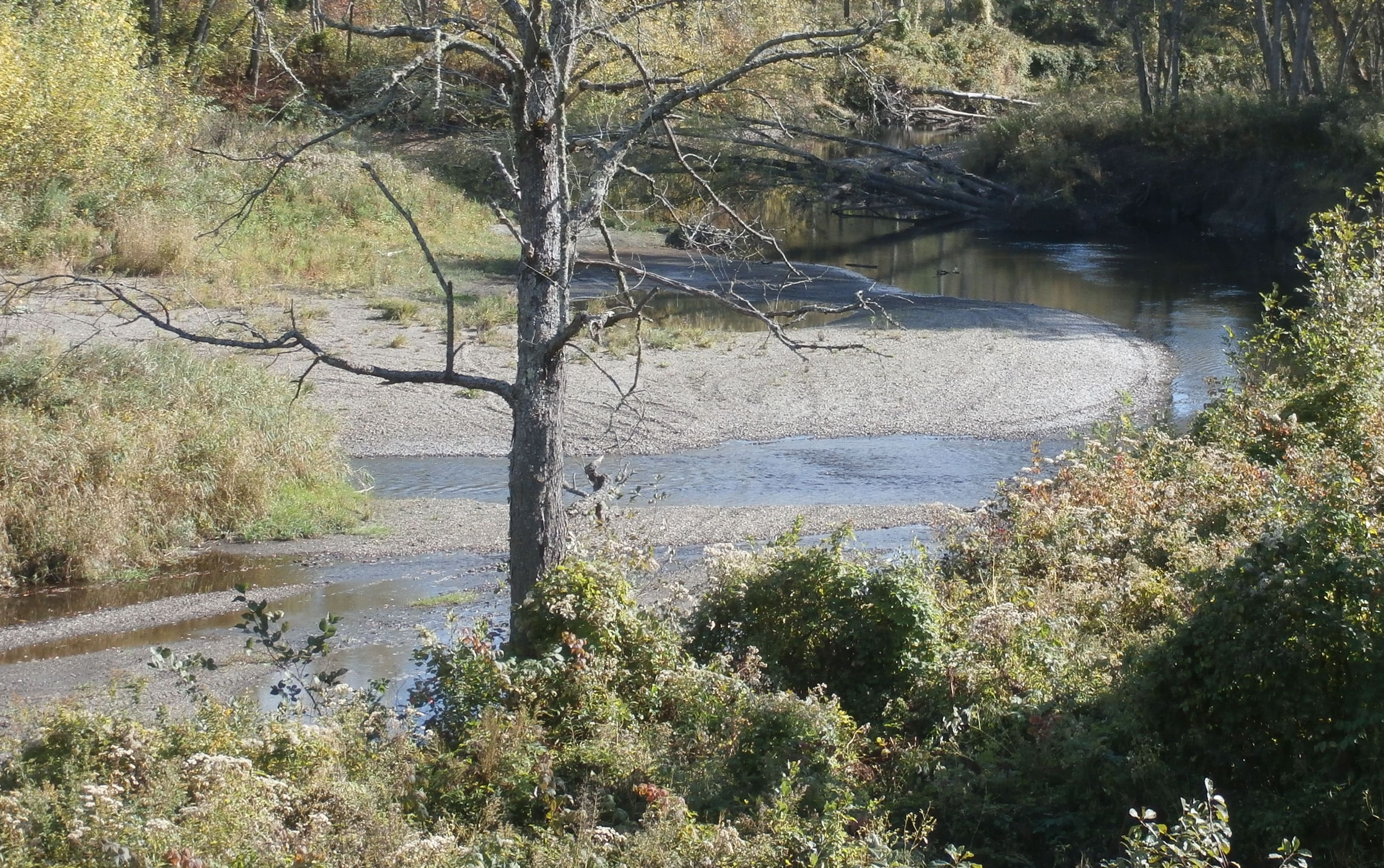
- Halls Stream near East Hereford, Quebec

Location
- Countries: Canada and United States
- Province and States: Quebec, New Hampshire and Vermont
- Administrative regions/counties: Estrie, QC; Coos County, NH; Essex County, VT
- Municipalities: Saint-Malo, QC; Saint-Venant-de-Paquette, QC; East Hereford, QC; Pittsburg, NH; Canaan, VT

Physical characteristics
- Source
  - location: Canada-US border (Québec-New Hampshire
  - coordinates: 45°13′30″N 71°25′31″W
  - elevation: 1,912 feet (583 m)
- Mouth: Connecticut River
  - location: Beecher Falls, Vermont
  - coordinates: 45°00′31″N 71°30′17″W
  - elevation: 1,072 feet (327 m)
- Length: 25.2 mi (40.6 km)

Basin features
- Tributaries
  - right: Ruisseau Buck

Halls Stream (known as Rivière Hall in Canada) is a 25.2-mile-long (40.6 km) tributary of the Connecticut River in eastern North America. For most of its length, it approximately follows the Canada–United States border, with the province of Quebec (Canada) to its west and the state of New Hampshire (United States) to its east.

== Geography ==
The stream flows from north to south, with a logging landscape on the New Hampshire side, and a mixture of woodland and farms on the Quebec side. Near the southern end of the stream, the international boundary diverges from Halls Stream and heads west, along a line which, when it was originally surveyed, was intended to be on the 45th parallel. South of this line, Halls Stream enters the state of Vermont, flowing through the town of Canaan in Essex County for a little over one-half mile (0.80 km). In the village of Beecher Falls, Vermont, it empties into the Connecticut River, which forms the boundary between Vermont and New Hampshire.

Where Halls Stream forms the international border, it divides the following municipalities:

- East side: Town of Pittsburg, Coos County, New Hampshire
- West side: Municipalities of Saint-Malo, Saint-Venant-de-Paquette, and East Hereford, in Coaticook Regional County Municipality, Estrie administrative region, Quebec

== History ==
Historically, Halls Stream factored into an international boundary dispute in this area, and it formed part of the border of the so-called Republic of Indian Stream.

== Toponymy ==
The term "Halls" is a surname of English origin.

The toponym "Rivière Hall" was officialized on December 5, 1968, at the Commission de toponymie du Québec (Quebec Geographical Names Board) and on October 29, 1980, in the United States Geographic Names Information System (GNIS).

== See also ==
- List of rivers of New Hampshire
- List of rivers of Quebec
- List of rivers of Vermont
- List of international border rivers
