= Columbia Bridge (Connecticut River) =

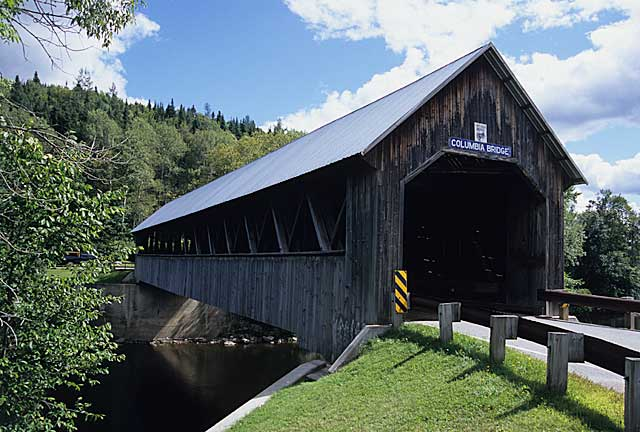
- Bridge in U.S. states of Vermont & New Hampshire
- Coordinates: 44°51′11″N 71°33′04″W
- Crosses: Connecticut River
- Locale: Columbia, New Hampshire and Lemington, Vermont
- Maintained by: Town of Columbia
- ID number: 29-04-07 (NH #33); 45-05-02 (VT)

Characteristics
- Design: Howe truss bridge
- Total length: 145.75 ft (44.42 m)
- Width: 20.58 ft (6.27 m)
- Longest span: 131.5 ft (40.08 m)
- Load limit: 3 tons
- Clearance above: 13.08 ft (3.987 m)

History
- Construction end: 1912
- Columbia Covered Bridge
- U.S. National Register of Historic Places
- Location within New Hampshire Location within the United States
- Nearest city: Columbia, New Hampshire
- Area: 1 acre (0.4 ha)
- Architect: Charles Babbitt
- Architectural style: Howe truss covered bridge
- NRHP reference No.: 76000123
- Added to NRHP: December 12, 1976

The Columbia Bridge is a covered bridge, carrying Columbia Bridge Road over the Connecticut River between Columbia, New Hampshire and Lemington, Vermont. Built in 1911–12, it is one of only two New Hampshire bridges (along with the Mount Orne Covered Bridge) built with Howe trusses, and is one of the last covered bridges built in the historic era of covered bridge construction in both states. It was listed on the National Register of Historic Places in 1976.

== Description and history ==
The Columbia Bridge stands in southeastern Lemington and northwestern Columbia, both rural communities in the northern parts of their respective states. It carries Columbia Bridge Road between United States Route 3 in New Hampshire and Vermont Route 102 in Vermont. It is in a rural agricultural setting, and is oriented northwest-to-southeast across the Connecticut River, on abutments of dry laid stone that have been faced in concrete. It is a wood-iron Howe truss design, with a single span that is 146 feet (45 m) long. The bridge has a total width of 20.5 feet (6.2 m) and a roadway with of 15.5 feet (4.7 m), and an internal clearance of 13 feet (4.0 m). The exterior is sheathed in vertical board siding, which extends a short way into each portal to protect the truss ends. The siding on the north side rises to a height of 6 feet (1.8 m), leaving an open space between it and the gabled roof.

The bridge was built by Charles Babbitt in 1912, replacing one destroyed by fire the previous year, and is the third to stand on the site. The bridge is considered to be one of the last built in either state during the historic period of covered bridge construction. It was rehabilitated by the state of New Hampshire in 1981 at a cost of $143,000.

== See also ==
- List of crossings of the Connecticut River
- List of covered bridges in New Hampshire
- List of bridges on the National Register of Historic Places in New Hampshire
- National Register of Historic Places listings in Coös County, New Hampshire
- List of covered bridges in Vermont
- List of bridges on the National Register of Historic Places in Vermont
- National Register of Historic Places listings in Essex County, Vermont
