= East Hereford =

- Municipality
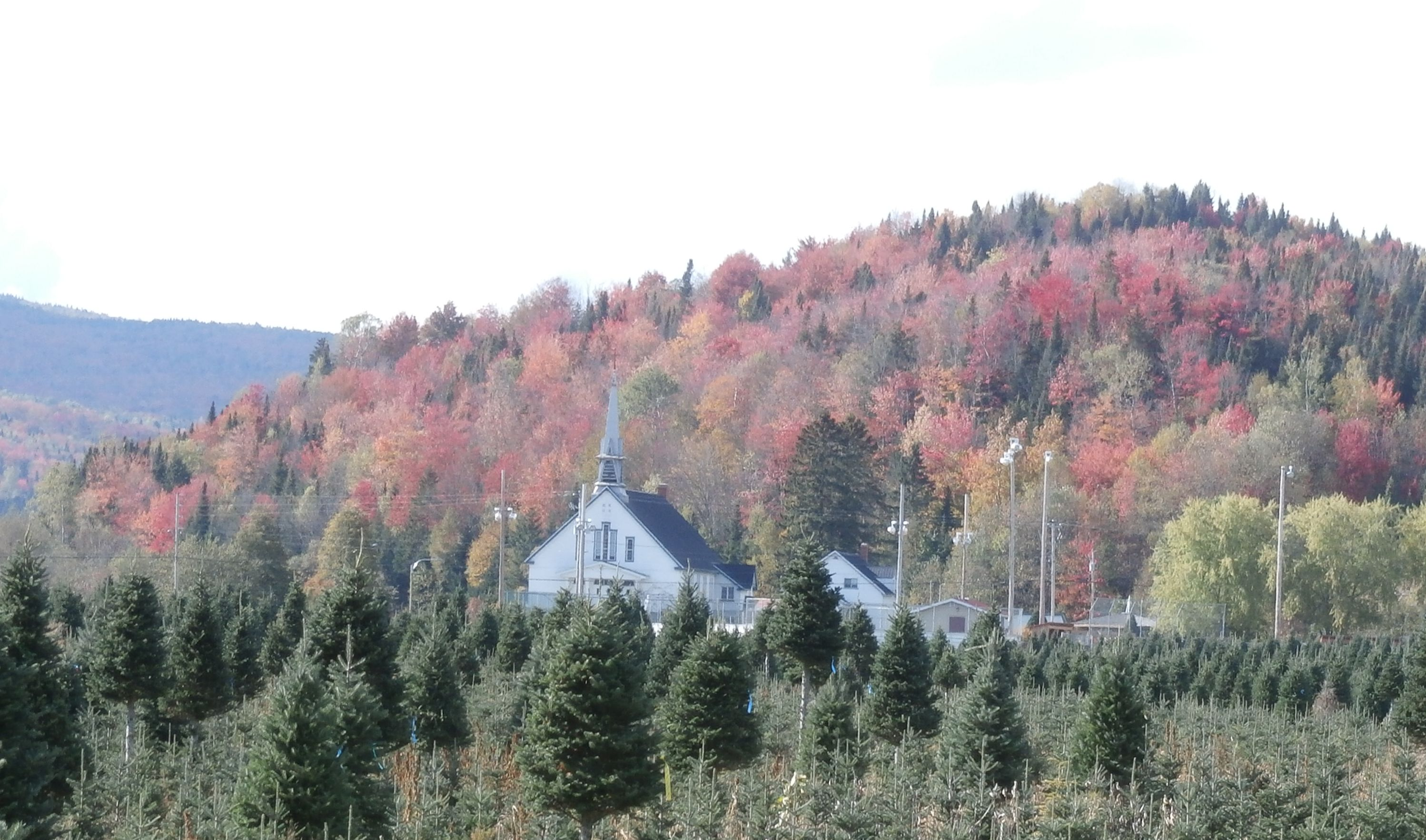

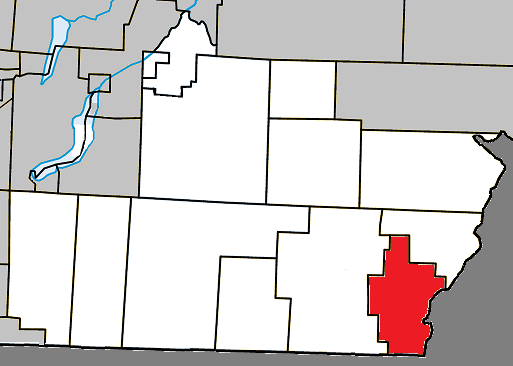
- Location within Coaticook RCM

- Location in southern Quebec
- Coordinates: 45°05′N 71°30′W
- Country: Canada
- Province: Quebec
- Region: Estrie
- RCM: Coaticook
- Constituted: July 1, 1855

Government
  - Mayor: Benoit Lavoie
  - Federal riding: Compton—Stanstead
  - Prov. riding: Saint-François

Area
  - Total: 73.30 km^{2} (28.30 sq mi)
  - Land: 72.19 km^{2} (27.87 sq mi)

Population (2016)
  - Total: 269
  - Density: 3.7/km^{2} (9.6/sq mi)
  - Pop 2011-2016: ▼12.1%
  - Dwellings: 145
- Time zone: UTC−5 (EST)
  - Summer (DST): UTC−4 (EDT)
- Postal code(s): J0B 1S0
- Area code: 819
- Highways: R-253
- Website: www.easthereford.ca

East Hereford is a municipality of about 260 people in southeastern Quebec, Canada, in Coaticook Regional County Municipality in the Estrie region. The Beecher Falls–East Hereford Border Crossing with the United States is located here.

East Hereford is located just north of Beecher Falls, Vermont, and on the east side of East Hereford it is bordered by New Hampshire. Halls Stream, a south-flowing tributary of the Connecticut River, forms the eastern boundary of the municipality and the Canada–United States border. Dairy farming and lumber products are the main sources of income in the area.

East Hereford includes the hamlet of Comins Mills. The nearby Mont Hereford has a developed trail network for the sport of mountain biking.

== Demographics ==
=== Population ===
Population trend:

Census	Population	Change (%)
2016	269	▼12.1%
2011	306	▼12.3%
2006	349	▲8.0%
2001	323	▲1.9%
1996	317	▼8.1%
1991	345	N/A

== See also ==
- List of anglophone communities in Quebec
