= Vermont Route 111 =

Highway in Vermont

Vermont Route 111
- Map of northeastern Vermont with VT 111 highlighted in red

Route information
- Maintained by VTrans
- Length: 15.137 mi (24.361 km)

Major junctions
- West end: VT 105 in Derby
- East end: VT 114 in Brighton

Location
- Country: United States
- State: Vermont
- Counties: Orleans, Essex

Highway system
- State highways in Vermont
← VT 110	→ VT 112

Vermont Route 111 (VT 111) is a state highway in the U.S. state of Vermont. The highway runs 15.137 miles (24.361 km) from VT 105 in Derby east to VT 114 in Brighton. VT 111 connects the incorporated village of Derby Center in eastern Orleans County with Morgan and the central Essex County town of Brighton.

== Route description ==
VT 111 begins at an intersection with VT 105 (Main Street) in the incorporated village of Derby Center. incorporated village of Derby Center. The two-lane highway heads east and passes to the south of Lake Derby. VT 111 veers southeast and crosses Green Brook and Orcutt Brook before passing through the southwest corner of Holland. The highway continues through the town of Morgan, in which the highway follows the shore of Lake Seymour between its crossings of the Lake Seymour inlet and Sucker Brook. VT 111 crosses Webster Brook before entering the town of Brighton, where the highway crosses the Pherrins River immediately before reaching its eastern terminus at VT 114 (Norton Road).

== Major intersections ==
County	Location	mi	km	Destinations	Notes
Orleans	Derby	0.000	0.000	VT 105 (Main Street) – Derby Line, Charleston	Western terminus
Essex	Brighton	15.137	24.361	VT 114 (Norton Road) – Island Pond, Norton	Eastern terminus
1.000 mi = 1.609 km; 1.000 km = 0.621 mi
