= Lemington, Vermont =

- Town
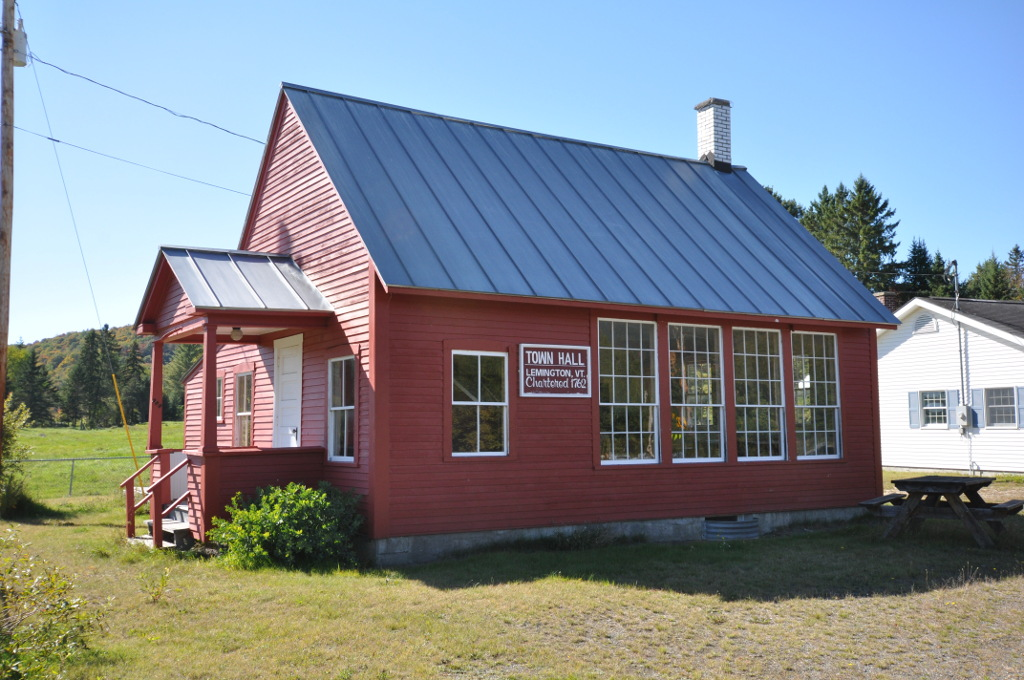
- Lemington Town hall

- Location in Essex County and the state of Vermont
- Coordinates: 44°53′20″N 71°35′25″W
- Country: United States
- State: Vermont
- County: Essex
- Chartered: 1762
- Settled: 1789
- Organized: 1796

Area
  - Total: 35.5 sq mi (92.0 km^{2})
  - Land: 35.4 sq mi (91.6 km^{2})
  - Water: 0.15 sq mi (0.4 km^{2})
- Elevation: 1,745 ft (532 m)

Population (2020)
  - Total: 87
  - Density: 2.3/sq mi (0.9/km^{2})
- Time zone: UTC-5 (EST)
  - Summer (DST): UTC-4 (EDT)
- ZIP Codes: 05903 (Lemington); 05905 (Guildhall)
- Area code: 802
- FIPS code: 50-39700
- GNIS feature ID: 1462133

Lemington is a town in Essex County, Vermont, United States. The population was 87 as of the 2020 census. It is part of the Berlin, NH –VT Micropolitan Statistical Area.

== Geography ==
Lemington is in northeastern Essex County along the Connecticut River, the border between Vermont and New Hampshire. The town is bordered to the southwest by Bloomfield, at its westernmost point by Lewis, to the northwest by Averill, and to the northeast by Canaan, all in Vermont. To the southeast, across the Connecticut, are the towns of Colebrook and Columbia, New Hampshire. Vermont Route 102 runs from south to north along the eastern edge of the town, following the Connecticut. Route 26 leads east across the Connecticut into Colebrook village. The villages of Lemington and Columbia are connected by the covered Columbia Bridge across the Connecticut.

According to the United States Census Bureau, the town of Lemington has a total area of 35.5 square miles (92.0 km^{2}), of which 35.4 square miles (91.6 km^{2}) is land and 0.2 square miles (0.4 km^{2}), or 0.41%, is water. The town's highest point is 3,148-foot (960 m) Monadnock Mountain, in the eastern part of town overlooking the Connecticut.

== Demographics ==
Historical population
Census	Pop.	Note	%±
1790	31		—
1800	52		67.7%
1810	132		153.8%
1820	139		5.3%
1830	183		31.7%
1840	124		−32.2%
1850	187		50.8%
1860	207		10.7%
1870	191		−7.7%
1880	222		16.2%
1890	227		2.3%
1900	204		−10.1%
1910	138		−32.4%
1920	145		5.1%
1930	133		−8.3%
1940	131		−1.5%
1950	105		−19.8%
1960	112		6.7%
1970	120		7.1%
1980	108		−10.0%
1990	102		−5.6%
2000	107		4.9%
2010	104		−2.8%
2020	87		−16.3%
U.S. Decennial Census

At the 2000 census there were 107 people, 49 households, and 34 families living in the town. The population density was 3.0 inhabitants per square mile (1.2/km^{2}). There were 77 housing units at an average density of 2.2 per square mile (0.85/km^{2}). The racial makeup of the town was 94.39% White, and 5.61% from two or more races. Of the 49 households 22.4% had children under the age of 18 living with them, 61.2% were married couples living together, 8.2% had a female householder with no husband present, and 30.6% were non-families. 28.6% of households were one person and 20.4% were one person aged 65 or older. The average household size was 2.18 and the average family size was 2.68.

The age distribution was 22.4% under the age of 18, 2.8% from 18 to 24, 20.6% from 25 to 44, 27.1% from 45 to 64, and 27.1% 65 or older. The median age was 52 years. For every 100 females, there were 118.4 males. For every 100 females age 18 and over, there were 93.0 males.

The median household income was $35,417 and the median family income was $47,500. Males had a median income of $28,750 versus $24,063 for females. The per capita income for the town was $17,146. There were no families and 1.3% of the population living below the poverty line, including no under eighteens and 5.9% of those over 64.

== Notable residents ==
- Edward Dow (1820–1894), architect
