= Colebrook (CDP), New Hampshire =

Census-designated place in New Hampshire, United States

Colebrook, New Hampshire
- Census-designated place
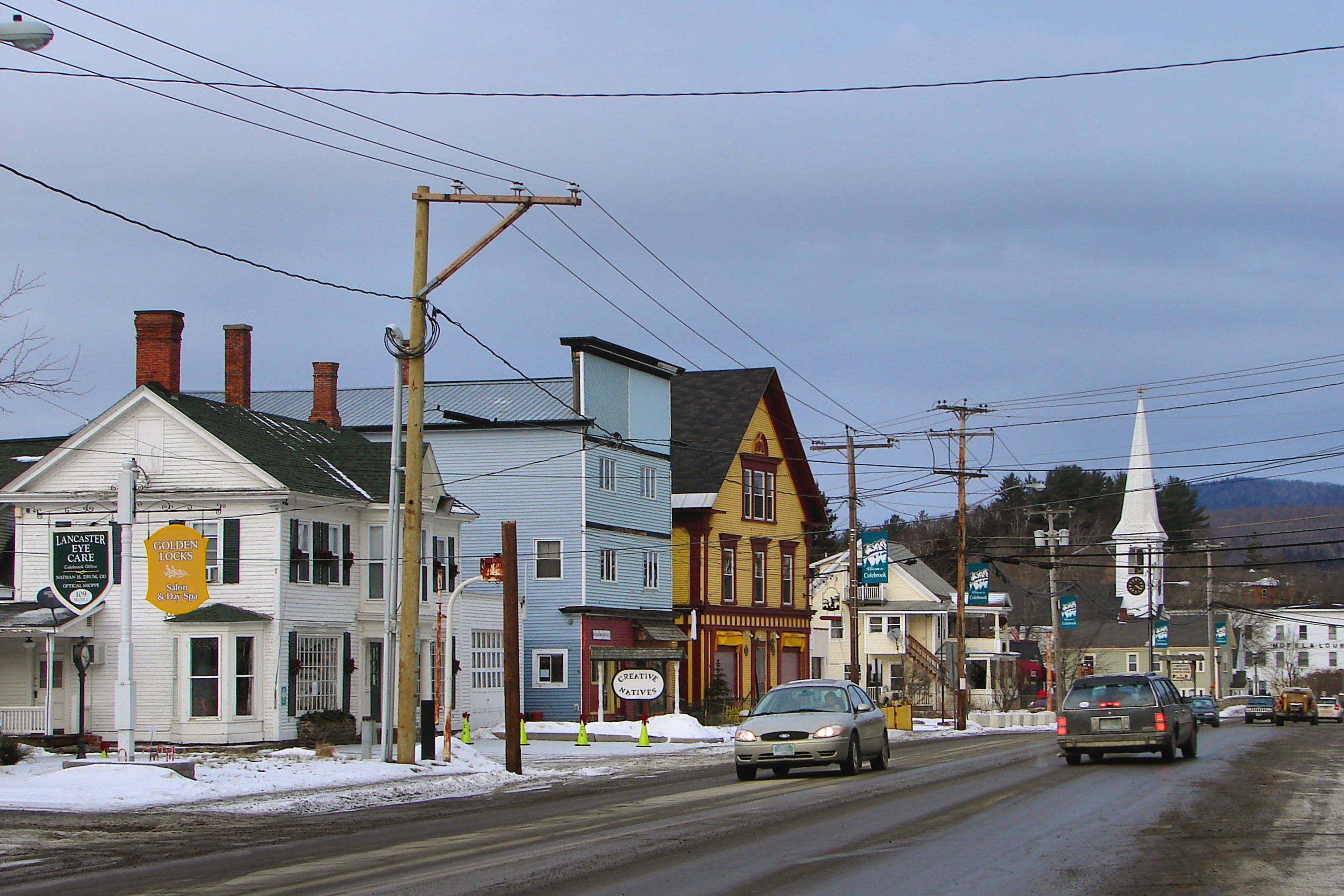
- Colebrook, New Hampshire

- Location within New Hampshire Location within the United States
- Coordinates: 44°53′32″N 71°29′48″W
- Country: United States
- State: New Hampshire
- County: Coös
- Town: Colebrook

Area
  - Total: 2.69 sq mi (6.97 km^{2})
  - Land: 2.62 sq mi (6.78 km^{2})
  - Water: 0.073 sq mi (0.19 km^{2})
- Elevation: 1,024 ft (312 m)

Population (2020)
  - Total: 1,201
  - Density: 458.8/sq mi (177.15/km^{2})
- Time zone: UTC-5 (Eastern (EST))
  - Summer (DST): UTC-4 (EDT)
- ZIP code: 03576
- Area code: 603
- FIPS code: 33-13700
- GNIS feature ID: 2629721

Colebrook is a census-designated place (CDP) and the main village in the town of Colebrook, New Hampshire, United States. The population of the CDP was 1,201 at the 2020 census, out of 2,084 in the entire town. The CDP population had dropped from 1,394 at the 2010 census.

== Geography ==
The CDP is in the western part of the town of Colebrook, along the east side of the Connecticut River where it is joined by the Mohawk River. U.S. Route 3 is Colebrook's Main Street, leading north 8 miles (13 km) to West Stewartstown and south 26 miles (42 km) to Groveton. New Hampshire Route 26 (Parsons Street) leads east from Route 3 10 miles (16 km) to Dixville Notch and west across the Connecticut River to Vermont Route 102. New Hampshire Route 145 (Park Street) leaves US 3 just north of NH 26, and leads northeast 13 miles (21 km) to Pittsburg.

The Colebrook CDP is bordered to the west by the Connecticut River, which is the Vermont border. The CDP extends to the north to include Hughes Road, and extends to the east to include Corliss Lane and the housing developments accessed from that road. Farther south, the CDP border follows Titus Hill Road and Skyline Drive, before turning west to Laflamme Drive and South Main Street.

According to the U.S. Census Bureau, the Colebrook CDP has a total area of 2.7 square miles (7.0 km^{2}), of which 2.6 square miles (6.8 km^{2}) are land and 0.1 square miles (0.2 km^{2}), or 2.88%, are water.

== Demographics ==
Historical population
| Census | Pop. | Note | %± |
|---|---|---|---|
| 1950 | 1,265 | | — |
| 1960 | 1,550 | | 22.5% |
| 1970 | 1,070 | | −31.0% |
| 1980 | 1,131 | | 5.7% |
| 2010 | 1,394 | | — |
| 2020 | 1,201 | | −13.8% |
U.S. Decennial Census

As of the census of 2010, there were 1,394 people, 687 households, and 344 families residing in the CDP. There were 788 housing units, of which 101, or 12.8%, were vacant. The racial makeup of the town was 97.3% white, 0.3% African American, 0.1% Native American, 0.6% Asian, 0.0% Pacific Islander, 0.4% some other race, and 1.4% from two or more races. 1.2% of the population were Hispanic or Latino of any race.

Of the 687 households in the CDP, 24.5% had children under the age of 18 living with them, 35.1% were headed by married couples living together, 11.8% had a female householder with no husband present, and 49.9% were non-families. 42.6% of all households were made up of individuals, and 21.6% were someone living alone who was 65 years of age or older. The average household size was 2.02, and the average family size was 2.72.

20.2% of people in the CDP were under the age of 18, 7.7% were from age 18 to 24, 22.6% were from 25 to 44, 28.8% were from 45 to 64, and 20.7% were 65 years of age or older. The median age was 44.7 years. For every 100 females, there were 90.2 males. For every 100 females age 18 and over, there were 88.2 males.

For the period 2011–15, the estimated median annual income for a household was $35,625, and the median income for a family was $49,886. Male full-time workers had a median income of $46,000 versus $36,650 for females. The per capita income for the CDP was $23,259. 23.8% of the population and 12.1% of families were below the poverty line, along with 38.9% of people under the age of 18 and 7.0% of people 65 or older.
