= West Stewartstown, New Hampshire =

Census-designated place in New Hampshire, United States

- Census-designated place
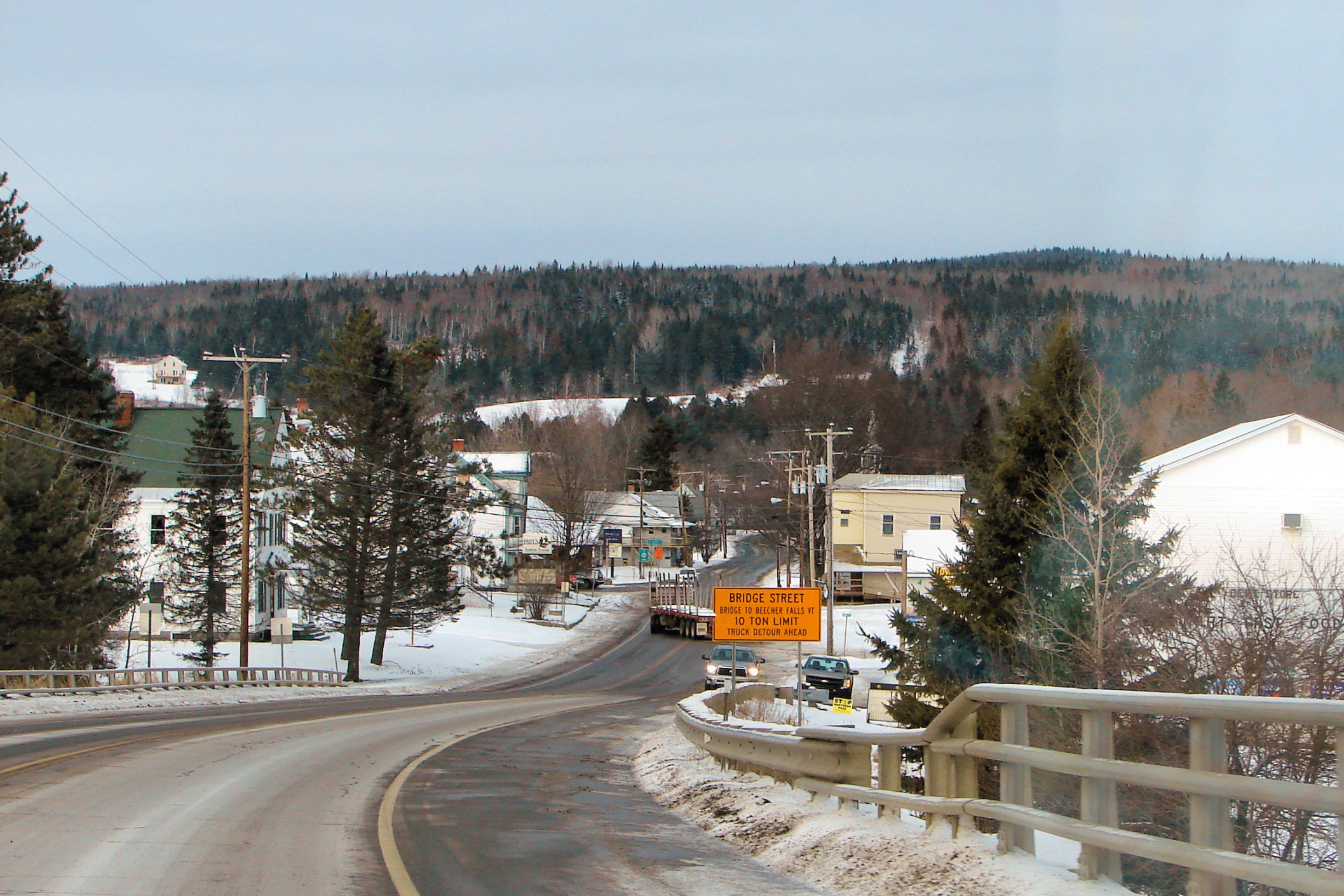
- The road through West Stewartstown

- Location within New Hampshire Location within the United States
- Coordinates: 44°59′26″N 71°31′52″W
- Country: United States
- State: New Hampshire
- County: Coös
- Town: Stewartstown

Area
  - Total: 0.67 sq mi (1.73 km^{2})
  - Land: 0.62 sq mi (1.60 km^{2})
  - Water: 0.050 sq mi (0.13 km^{2})
- Elevation: 1,089 ft (332 m)

Population (2020)
  - Total: 263
  - Density: 424.8/sq mi (164.03/km^{2})
- Time zone: UTC-5 (Eastern (EST))
  - Summer (DST): UTC-4 (EDT)
- ZIP code: 03597
- Area code: 603
- FIPS code: 33-83620
- GNIS feature ID: 2629746

West Stewartstown is a census-designated place in the town of Stewartstown, New Hampshire, United States. It had a population of 263 at the 2020 census, down from 386 at the 2010 census.

== Geography ==
The CDP is located along U.S. Route 3 and the Connecticut River in the northwestern corner of Stewartstown, directly across the river from Canaan, Vermont, and one mile south of the Canada–US border. Route 3 leads south 8 miles (13 km) to Colebrook and northeast 10 miles (16 km) to Pittsburg. The nearest international border crossings are Canaan–Hereford Road, 1.9 miles (3.1 km) northwest of West Stewartstown via Vermont Routes 114 and 141, and Beecher Falls–East Hereford, 2.2 miles (3.5 km) to the northeast via Vermont Route 253.

According to the United States Census Bureau, the West Stewartstown CDP has a total area of 0.67 square miles (1.73 km^{2}), of which 0.62 square miles (1.60 km^{2}) are land and 0.05 square miles (0.13 km^{2}), or 7.37%, are water.

== Demographics ==
Historical population
Census	Pop.	Note	%±
2010	386		—
2020	263		−31.9%
U.S. Decennial Census

As of the census of 2010, there were 386 people, 119 households, and 76 families residing in the CDP. There were 140 housing units, of which 21, or 15.0%, were vacant. The racial makeup of the CDP was 98.7% white, 0.3% African American, 0.3% Native American, and 0.8% two or more races. None of the population were Hispanic or Latino of any race.

Of the 119 households in the CDP, 31.9% had children under the age of 18 living with them, 45.4% were headed by married couples living together, 9.2% had a female householder with no husband present, and 36.1% were non-families. 28.6% of all households were made up of individuals, and 10.1% were someone living alone who was 65 years of age or older. The average household size was 2.39, and the average family size was 2.91.

18.4% of residents in the CDP were under the age of 18, 10.4% were from age 18 to 24, 19.6% were from 25 to 44, 21.9% were from 45 to 64, and 29.8% were 65 years of age or older. The median age was 46.8 years. For every 100 females, there were 94.0 males. For every 100 females age 18 and over, there were 95.7 males.

For the period 2011–15, the estimated median annual income for a household was $32,083, and the median income for a family was $45,417. The per capita income for the CDP was $18,406.
