= Canaan–Hereford Road Border Crossing =

Canada–United States border crossing

Canaan-Hereford Road Border Crossing
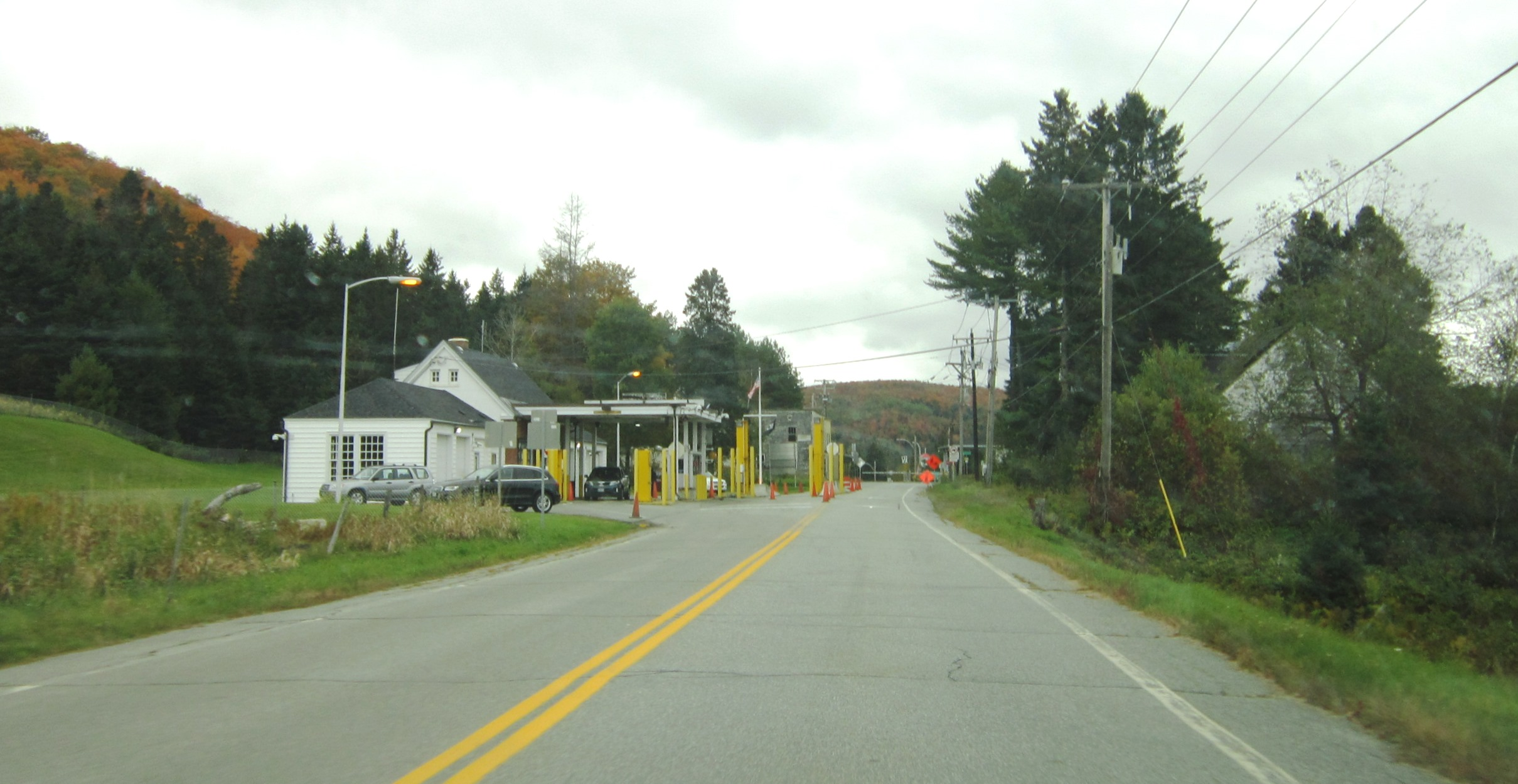
- US Border Inspection Station at Canaan, Vermont

Location
- Country: United States; Canada
- Location: VT 141 / R-141; US Port: Vermont 141 Canaan, Vermont 05903; Canadian Port: Highway 141, Stanhope, Quebec J0B 2W0
- Coordinates: 45.012666°N 71.56028°W

Details
- Opened: 1930

Website
- Official Canadian website; Official United States website
- U.S. Inspection Station-Canaan, Vermont
- U.S. National Register of Historic Places
- MPS: U.S. Border Inspection Stations MPS
- NRHP reference No.: 14000601
- Added to NRHP: September 10, 2014

The Canaan–Hereford Road Border Crossing connects the towns of Saint-Herménégilde, Quebec and Canaan, Vermont on the Canada–US border. The crossing is at the junction of Quebec Route 141 and Vermont Route 141, and is open 24 hours for non-commercial traffic. Both the US and Canada border inspection stations are among the oldest buildings still being operated by the respective agencies. The US border station was listed on the National Register of Historic Places in 2014.

== Setting ==
The Canada–United States border between Vermont and Quebec is essentially a straight east–west line. This border crossing is located west of Leach Creek, a tributary of the Connecticut River and northwest of the village center of Canaan. The Canadian village of Hereford, a small cluster of buildings, is set just north of the border, while the area immediately south of the border is rural.

The crossing is three miles (4.8 km) from the Beecher Falls–East Hereford Border Crossing. A US Border patrol regional headquarters is between the two crossings. Remnants of the old Canaan Line House still stand abandoned between the two countries' border inspection stations. It once served as a popular watering hole during Prohibition.

== Canadian station ==
The Canadian station is located a short way north of the border, on the east side of Quebec 141.

== United States station ==
The United States station is located about 700 feet (210 m) south of the border, on the west side of Vermont 141. It is a 1 1/2-story brick structure with Georgian Revival styling, covered by gabled roof. Single-story four-bay garage wings with hip roof extend to each side, and a metal porte-cochere protects a single lane of traffic during processing. The main block is three bays wide, with display windows flanking a center entrance. The interior is symmetrically arranged, with one side for immigration, and the other for customs. Two of the southern garage bays have been converted into a restroom.

The station was built in 1933, as part of a major program by the United States to improve its land border security. This program was prompted by increased use of the automobile, a rise in illegal immigration, and of smuggling during Prohibition. It was one of the first stations built in the state under this program, and follows a plan similar to that of other period stations. It is one of ten surviving 1930s stations in the state.

== See also ==
- List of Canada–United States border crossings
- National Register of Historic Places listings in Essex County, Vermont
