= New Hampshire Route 26 =

State highway in New Hampshire, US

Route 26
- Route 26 highlighted in red

Route information
- Maintained by NHDOT
- Length: 30.860 mi (49.664 km): Vermont: 0.013 miles (0.021 km); New Hampshire: 30.847 miles (49.643 km)
- Existed: 1925–present

Major junctions
- West end: VT 102 in Lemington, VT
- US 3 in Colebrook; NH 16 in Errol
- East end: SR 26 in Upton, ME

Location
- Country: United States
- State: New Hampshire
- Counties: VT: Essex, NH: Coos

Highway system
- New Hampshire Highway System; Interstate; US; State; Turnpikes
← NH 25	→ NH 27
← VT 25B	VT	→ VT 30
← Route 25A	N.E.	→ Route 28

New Hampshire Route 26 (abbreviated NH 26) is a 30.860-mile-long (49.664 km) state highway located in northern New Hampshire. It runs across the state in a roughly northwest-to-southeast trajectory, stretching from the Vermont border in the west to the Maine border in the east. NH 26 is a multi-state route with both states.

At its western end, NH 26 connects to Vermont Route 102 in Lemington via the extremely short, yet fully designated Vermont Route 26 (VT 26). At 0.013 miles (21 m; 69 ft) in length, it is by far the shortest state route in Vermont. At its eastern end, NH 26 meets Maine State Route 26 which connects with the city of Portland in the south.

The number 26 dates from 1922, when the multi-state route was first designated New England Interstate Route 26 as part of the New England road marking system of the 1920s.

== Route description ==
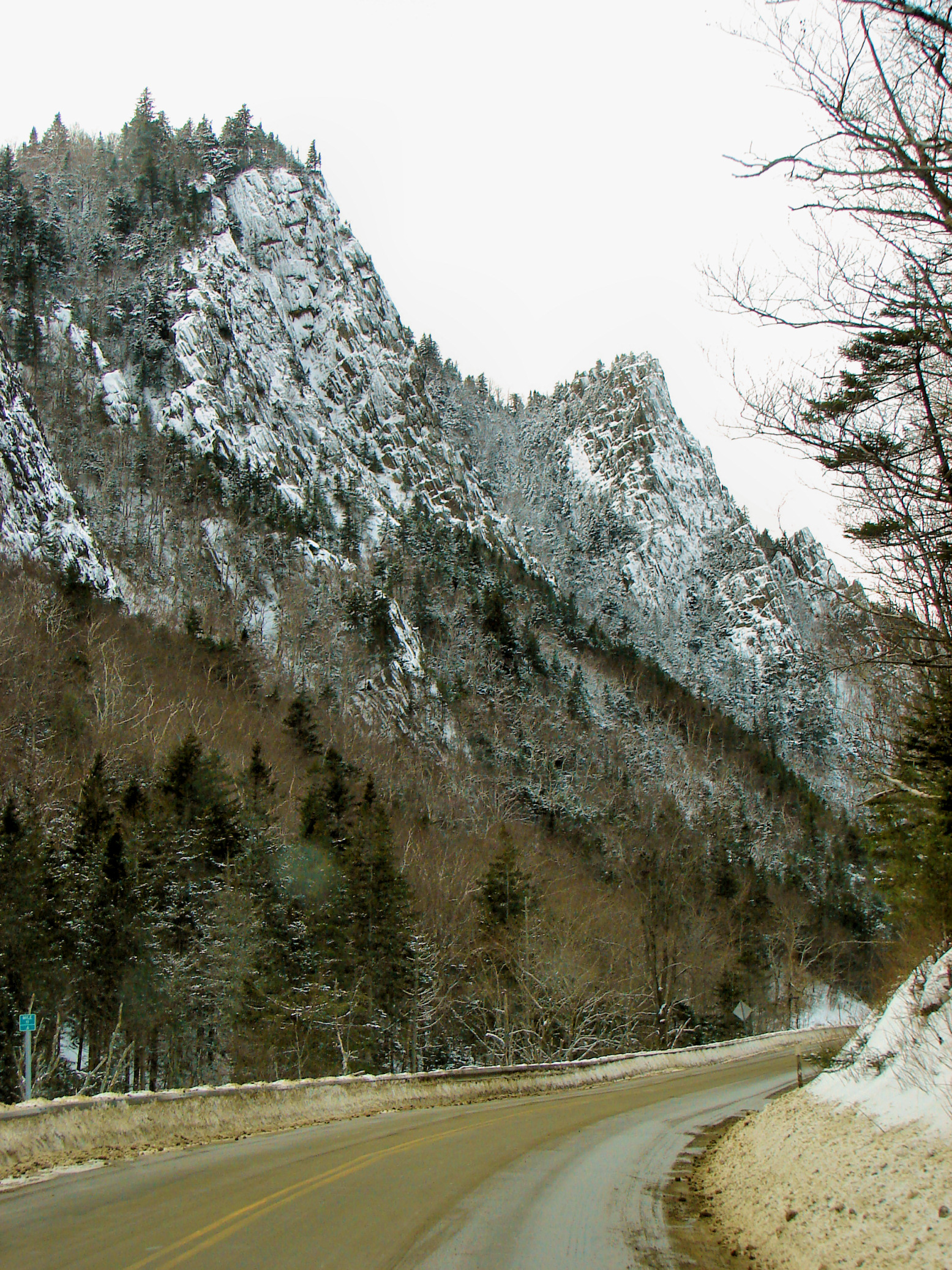
NH 26 running through Dixville Notch

NH 26 is a mostly isolated highway which runs through mountainous terrain. The highway begins in the west at the state line between Lemington, Vermont and Colebrook, New Hampshire along the Connecticut River. It is connected to Vermont Route 102 via the short stub highway VT 26. The highway runs east into downtown Colebrook where it intersects with U.S. Route 3. NH 26 briefly overlaps with US 3 before splitting off east again towards Dixville (the southern end of the overlap is the historic northern terminus of New England Interstate Route 26). From Colebrook to Dixville, NH 26 runs tightly along the Mohawk River, a tributary of the Connecticut. NH 26 runs through Dixville Notch, a mountain pass of the northernmost White Mountains at an altitude of approximately 1,800 feet (550 m), which has its own state park. The site of the 15,000-acre (61 km^{2}) Balsams Grand Resort Hotel, which opened during the Civil War but was closed in 2011, is also located along NH 26. After leaving Dixville (which the "Notch" is a part of) NH 26 nicks the northeastern corner of the township of Millsfield before entering the town of Errol, where it meets its only other major intersection at NH 16. The two routes are briefly cosigned in the downtown area before NH 16 splits off to the northeast. NH 26, heading southeast, crosses the Androscoggin River and then runs along the southwestern side of Umbagog Lake. It passes through the northeastern corner of the township of Cambridge before crossing into Upton, Maine and continuing as Maine State Route 26 south (SR 26 is a north–south highway).

=== Vermont Route 26 ===
Vermont Route 26
- Location: Lemington
- Length: 0.013 mi (21 m)

Originally the Lemington State Highway, Vermont Route 26 is the short connection between Vermont Route 102 and the New Hampshire state line. It is only 0.013 mi (68.64 ft) long, but is signed and recognized by VTrans as a state route. It is by far the shortest state route in Vermont. The next shortest, Vermont Route 119 (another of many short connectors of multi-state routes in Vermont), is about six times longer at 420 feet (130 m).

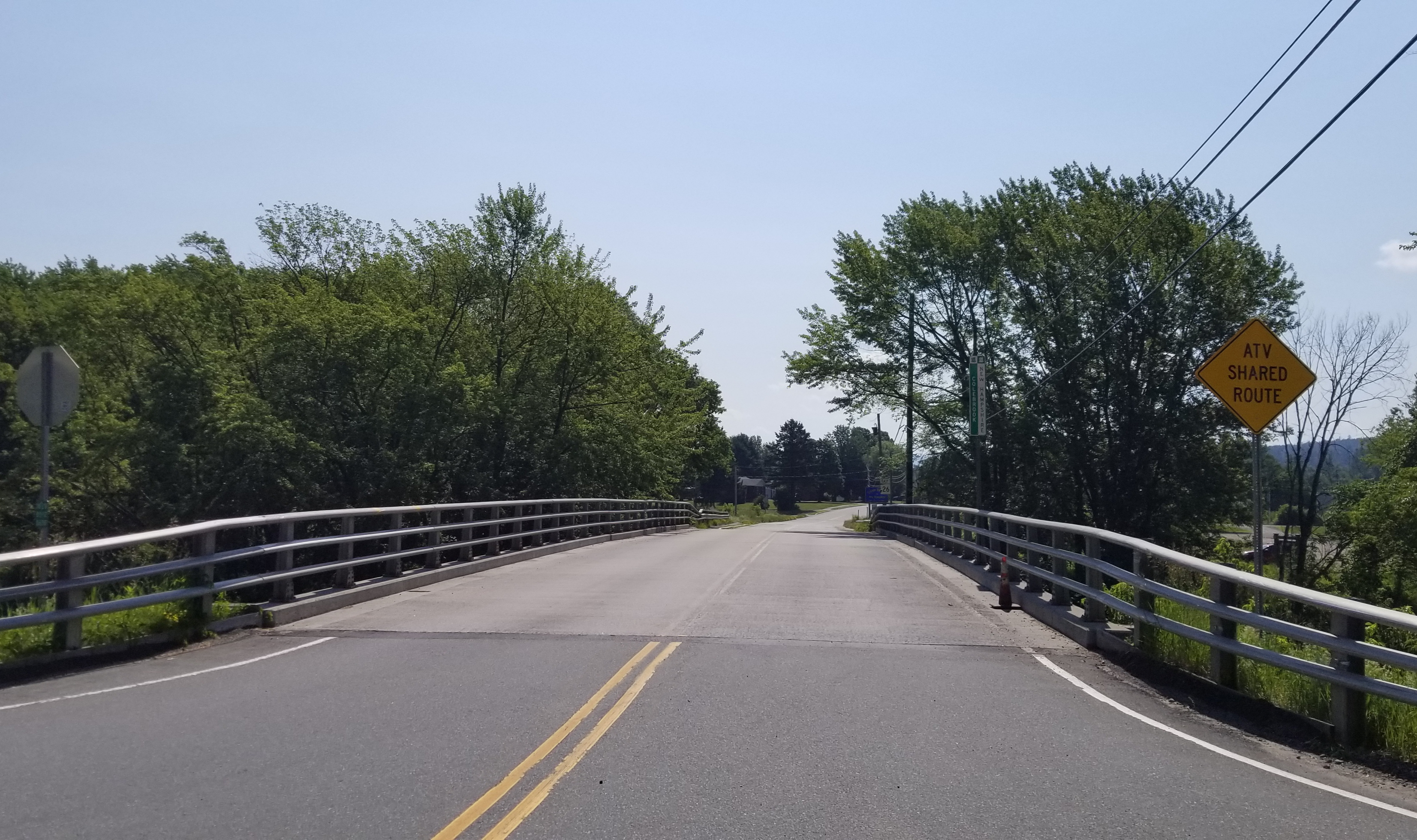
The entire length of Vermont Route 26 as viewed from the western end. The eastern terminus of the route is a town line marker 1/3 of the way across the bridge.

== History ==
The entirety of modern NH 26, VT 26 and Maine State Route 26 were initially designated New England Interstate Route 26 (NEI 26) as part of the New England road marking system introduced in 1922, following nearly the same exact route as today. NEI 26 was known as the Dixville Notch Way and originally stretched from Portland in the south (where it connected to New England Interstate Route 1 - modern U.S. Route 1) to Colebrook in the north (where it connected to New England Interstate Route 6 - modern U.S. Route 3). At some point, the route was extended to the Vermont state border to connect with what is now Vermont Route 102 in Lemington. In 1925, the United States Numbered Highways supplanted the New England Interstate system and NEI 26 was redesignated as a set of state highways bearing the number 26. The New Hampshire (and by extension, Vermont) section of the roadway has not undergone any significant changes since then.

NEI 26 was clearly intended to be a north–south highway, which SR 26 in Maine illustrates. However, NH 26 is signed as an east–west highway, reflecting its orientation within the state. This means that, in driving the old Interstate route from south to north, mileposts on NH 26 will actually be decreasing since mileposts normally increase from west to east.

== Major intersections ==
State	County	Location	mi	km	Destinations	Notes
Vermont	Essex	Lemington	0.000	0.000	VT 102 – Canaan, Bloomfield	Western terminus
Connecticut River			0.013 0.000	0.021 0.000	Vermont–New Hampshire state line	
New Hampshire	Coos	Colebrook	0.644	1.036	US 3 north (Main Street) to NH 145 – West Stewartstown, Clarksville	Western end of concurrency with US 3
New Hampshire	Coos	Colebrook	0.751	1.209	US 3 south (Main Street) – Lancaster	Eastern end of concurrency with US 3
New Hampshire	Coos	Errol	22.287	35.867	NH 16 south (Berlin Road) – Milan, Berlin	Western end of concurrency with NH 16
New Hampshire	Coos	Errol	22.583	36.344	NH 16 north (Dam Road) – Wentworth Location, Rangeley ME	Eastern end of concurrency with NH 16
New Hampshire	Coos	Cambridge	30.847	49.643	SR 26 south (Thistle Street) – Upton	Continuation into Maine
1.000 mi = 1.609 km; 1.000 km = 0.621 mi: Concurrency terminus
