= Colebrook, New Hampshire =

- Town
- Colebrook, New Hampshire, from the southwest

- Seal

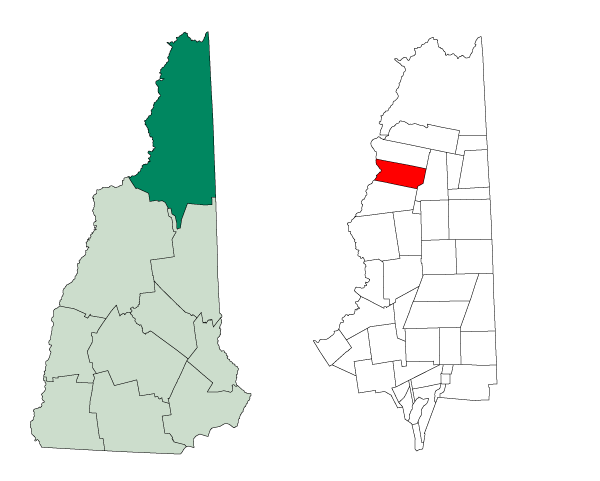
- Location in Coös County, New Hampshire
- Coordinates: 44°53′40″N 71°24′50″W
- Country: United States
- State: New Hampshire
- County: Coös
- Incorporated: 1796
- Villages: Colebrook; Kidderville; Upper Kidderville

Area
  - Total: 40.72 sq mi (105.46 km^{2})
  - Land: 40.51 sq mi (104.92 km^{2})
  - Water: 0.21 sq mi (0.54 km^{2}) 0.51%
- Elevation: 1,581 ft (482 m)

Population (2020)
  - Total: 2,084
  - Density: 52/sq mi (19.9/km^{2})
- Time zone: UTC-5 (Eastern)
  - Summer (DST): UTC-4 (Eastern)
- ZIP code: 03576
- Area code: 603
- FIPS code: 33-13780
- GNIS feature ID: 871097
- Website: www.colebrooknh.org

Colebrook is a town in Coös County, New Hampshire, United States. The population was 2,084 at the time of the 2020 census, down from 2,301 at the 2010 census, and was estimated to be 2,110 in 2025. Situated in the Great North Woods Region, it is bounded on the west by the Connecticut River and home to Beaver Brook Falls Natural Area.

The main village of the town, where 1,201 people resided at the 2020 census, is defined as the Colebrook census-designated place (CDP), and is located at the junction of U.S. Route 3 with New Hampshire Route 26. The town also includes the villages of Kidderville, Upper Kidderville, and Factory Village.

Colebrook is part of the Berlin, New Hampshire micropolitan area.

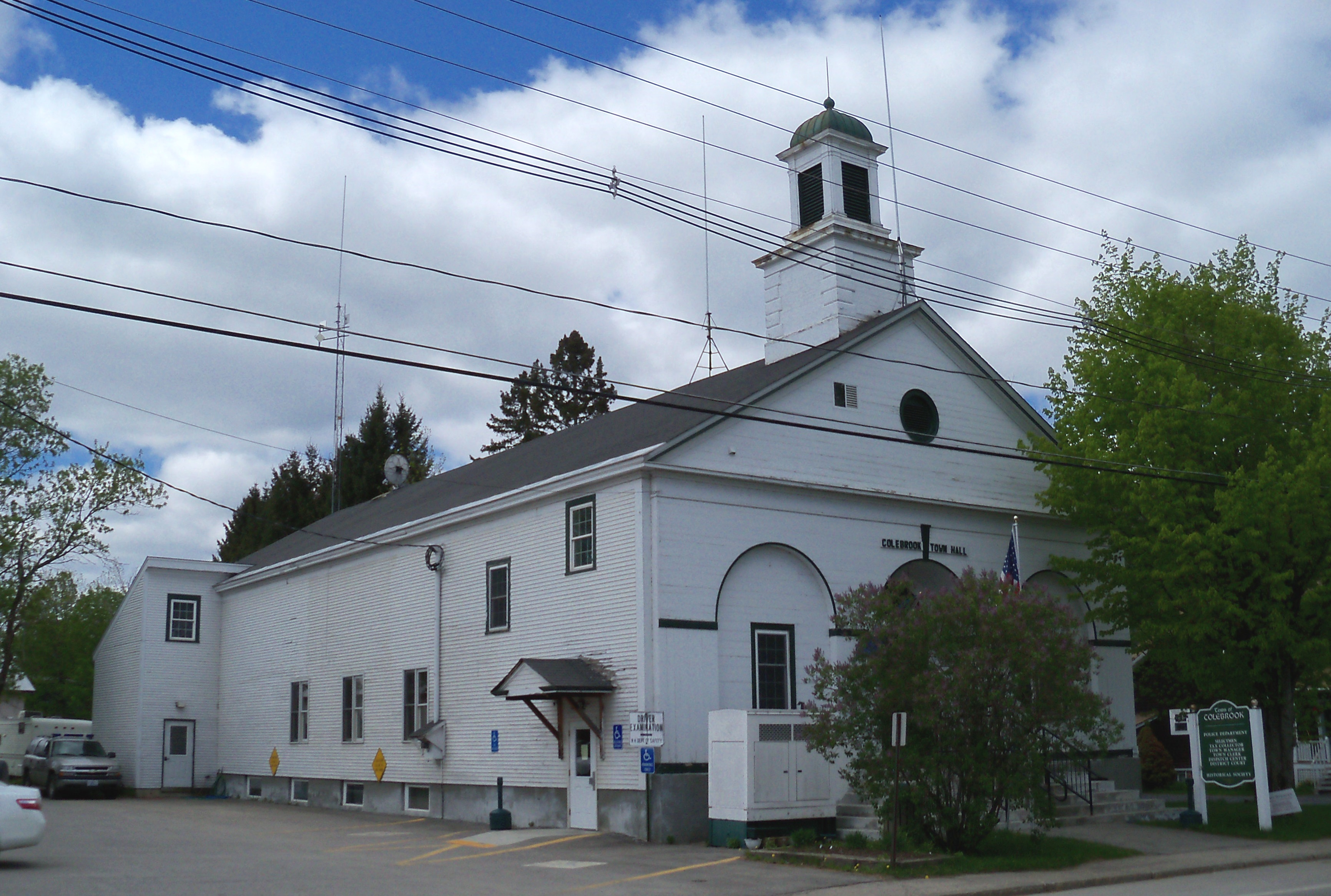
Colebrook Town Hall

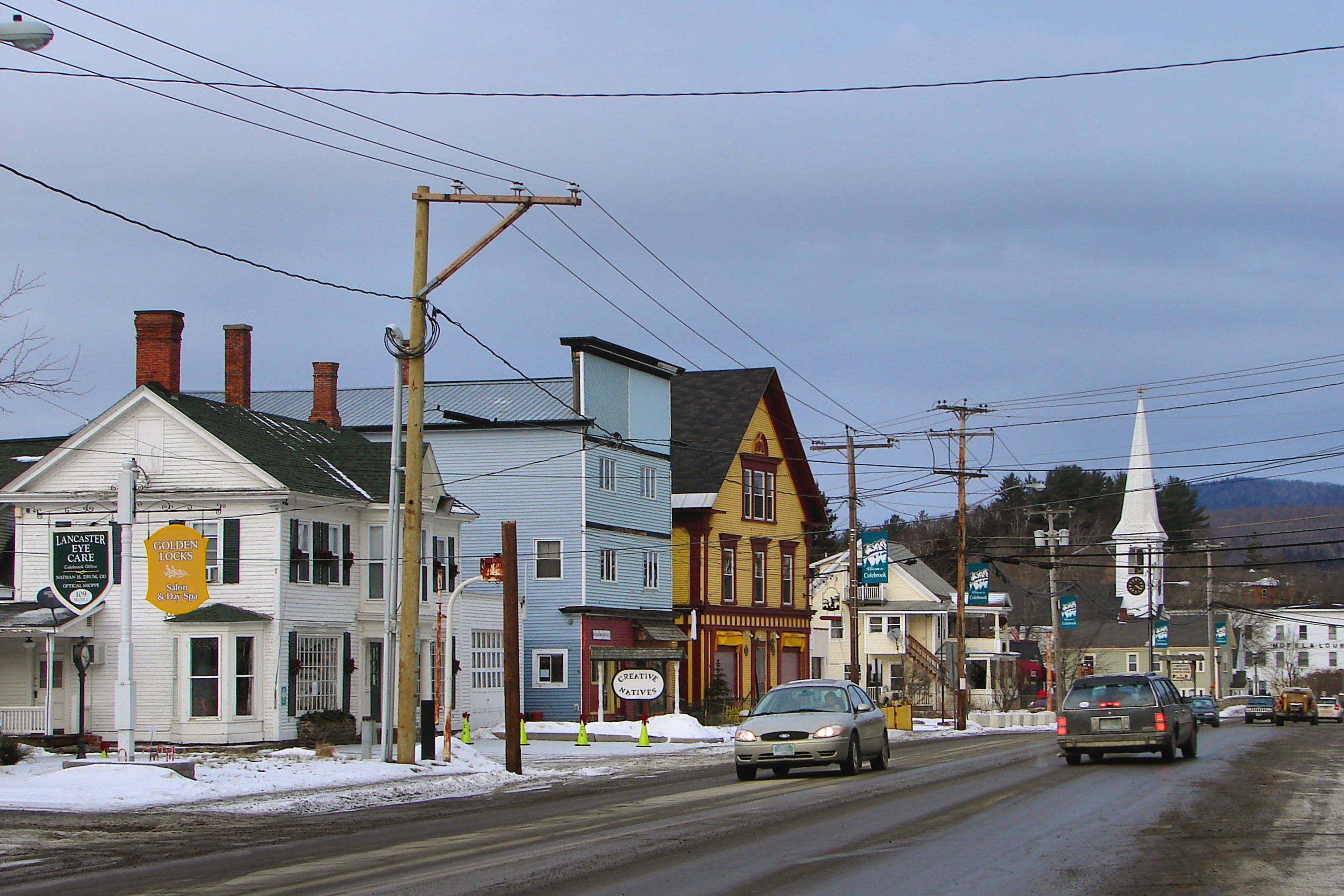
Colebrook Main Street in 2012

== History ==
First granted in 1762 by New Hampshire's colonial Governor Benning Wentworth, the territory was named "Dryden", after English poet and playwright John Dryden. Due to the inability of its original grantees to settle the remote area, however, it was regranted in 1770 by Colonial Governor John Wentworth, who renamed it "Colebrook Town" after Sir George Colebrooke, the East India Company's chairman of the board. It was settled that same year by a single family by the name of Rosebrook, but the family was driven out by the Revolutionary War, and further settlement did not occur until after the war's end. The 1790 census recorded a population of 29, and the town was incorporated as Colebrook on June 11, 1796. For many years, it was the shire town of the Northern Judicial District of Coos County. Today, it has a district branch of the Lancaster Superior Court.

A conflicting account holds that the town "was originally called Coleburne and was granted to Sir George Colebrook and others. It was incorporated June 11, 1795."

The first road through the town was known as River Road, taking a route that is roughly followed today by U.S. Route 3, the Daniel Webster Highway. The first surveyed lots in the town comprised about 100 acres (40 ha) each, running from River Road to the Connecticut River. Settlement then proceeded up two new roads, Titus Hill Road and what is now Pleasant Street. Titus Hill leads southeast out of the town center up to high ground in the neighboring town of Columbia that supports farming, while Pleasant Street, now a short road in Colebrook village, led east up the valley of the Mohawk River (now the route of New Hampshire Route 26) to the area of East Colebrook, the present-day village of Kidderville, and what was known as "Factory Village", which grew about 2 miles (3 km) east of the present village of Colebrook around a woolen mill constructed in 1816.

In 1803, seven years after the incorporation of the town, historian Timothy Dwight wrote, "Everything in this township exhibits the activity and enterprise of its inhabitants; their roads, plantations, barns and schoolhouses are well built. Their dwelling houses are principally of logs; but they are beginning to form better, and will soon be lodged very comfortable. Mills they have already." The first sawmill and gristmill in the town were constructed around 1800 by Andrew McAllaster and his son, William, on the west side of the Beaver Brook bridge on what is now Main Street (Route 3) at the north end of the present village. The first brick maker was the Loomis kiln, located north of the current village approximately where the IGA grocery store now stands. A larger brickmaker, Pratt & Smith, constructed a large kiln about 1826 in the Factory Village area. In 1822 a new brick woolen mill was constructed in Factory Village along the Mohawk River and produced at its peak 6,000 to 7,000 pounds (2,700 to 3,200 kg) of finished wool per year. It was capable of producing 50 yards (46 m) of cloth per day, including flannel and blankets.

What is now Colebrook village, located on the eastern edge of the Connecticut River bottomlands where the Mohawk River enters, began to grow in the decade following 1811, when the Walker House was constructed at the corner of present-day Main and Pleasant streets. Commercial buildings began to appear in 1816 on the block of Main Street between Pleasant Street and Parsons Street.

The area was noted for excellent farming soil. After the Coos Trail through Dixville Notch was created in 1803, farmers loaded sleds each winter with potash, pearlash, wheat and other produce, including potato whiskey, to exchange in Portland, Maine, for molasses, saltfish and other necessities. According to the 1874 Gazetteer, Colebrook was the Potato Capital of New Hampshire, producing over 120,000 bushels per year, most of which were milled into potato starch. Some were distilled into "potato whiskey." This industry dated back to 1848, when Sherburn R. Merrill bought land in Factory Village along the Mohawk River to build a starch mill, originally with 150 tons capacity. Other starch factories soon followed. At its peak, the town was producing, according to James O. Adams in 1877, "approximately one third of the potato starch in the state. Considered another way, one twentieth of all the starch produced in the United States came from the Colebrook area during this period." The starch industry began to decline after 1880, due to lack of fertilization in the area's potato farms. Gradually, the area turned to dairy farming.

Abundant regional forests helped Colebrook become a lumbering center, with the first sawmill established at Beaver Brook in 1800. Between 1868 and 1915, the town was witness to great log drives.

Other local manufacturing businesses, including blacksmiths, bobbin mills, boot- and shoemakers, carriage shops, cheesemakers, and tanneries, grew in the area through the 1800s, until the arrival of the railroad in 1887 connected the town to larger suppliers of goods.

Tourism has been a growing component of Colebrook's economy since the 19th century. As early as 1804, an inn was constructed by the McAllaster family on what is now North Main Street. Chamberlain's Tavern was built in 1816 and was for a time the meeting place of the town's militia; it is now the Jenkins/Jacoby Funeral Home. Three large hotels were built in Colebrook in the mid-1800s. The earliest was the Colebrook House, originally a large private home that was converted to an inn in the 1840s. After a series of conversions of use and two fires, a new hotel occupying the site was built in 1903 and still is in operation. The second hotel to be built in the town was the Parsons House (1862) on the south corner of Main and Parsons streets; it had a 75-foot-long (23 m) dining room that could seat 125 guests. The Parsons House burned in 1890 and was not rebuilt. The Monadnock House, built in the late 1860s, burned in 1895 and was replaced with a new structure that had 70 guest rooms. By the late 1940s, it had been sold to the Daughters of Charity of the Sacred Heart of Jesus for a convent and boarding school. In 1971 it was sold to the town of Colebrook, and the building was torn down in 1977.

During the Gilded Age, a new grand hotel was planned for Colebrook. Called the Metallak after Native American chief Metallak, the imposing Victorian structure was designed by architect John Calvin Stevens, and intended to attract tourists arriving by railroad to escape the summer heat and pollution in big cities. Construction began on Lombard's Hill, but a violent windstorm in April 1893 destroyed the frame, and investors abandoned the project. Stevens then reused the building's scheme, while reducing its size by two-fifths, to become the Bay of Naples Inn at Naples, Maine, which opened in 1899. Although the Metallak itself was never finished, its extensive plans are preserved among the architect's papers at the Maine Historical Society, making the ill-fated Colebrook hotel perhaps the most thoroughly documented design of its type in the White Mountains.

The Balsams Grand Resort Hotel was built in neighboring Dixville Notch in 1874. The resort's golf course is located on land in Colebrook that overlooks the notch and the hotel. Another hotel, the Hampshire Inn, was located on the Colebrook/Columbia town line and enjoyed a heyday in the 1890s and 1900s. The building was demolished in the 1970s, and the land was part of the Shrine of Our Lady of Grace along U.S. Route 3, which itself closed in July 2014.

Serial killer Christopher Wilder's nationwide murder spree ended at a Colebrook gas station on April 13, 1984, when two New Hampshire state troopers attempted to apprehend him, but in a scuffle Wilder shot and killed himself as well as seriously wounding one of the troopers.

On August 19, 1997, Carl Drega carried out a shooting spree in the town killing two state troopers, a judge and a newspaper editor. He was later killed in a shootout with law enforcement in Vermont.

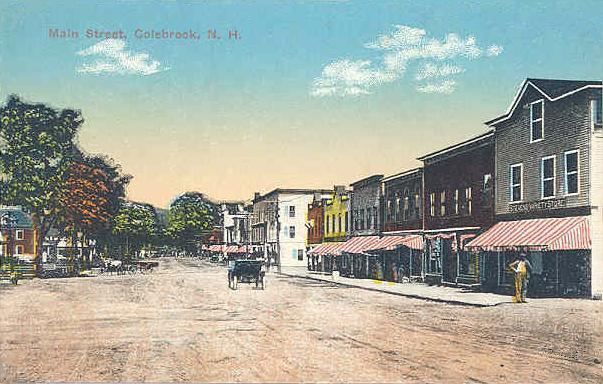
Main Street c. 1915

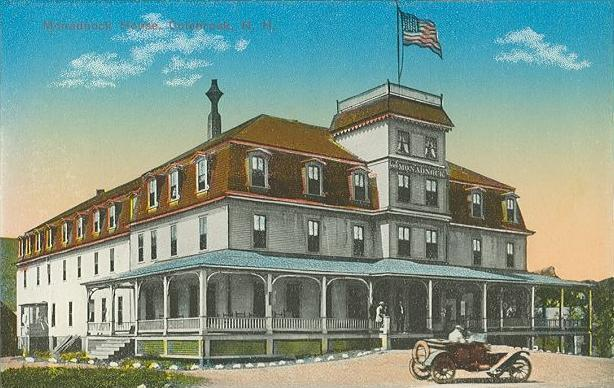
Monadnock House c. 1915

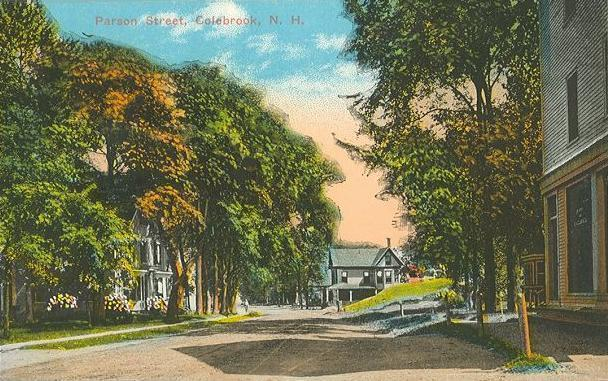
Parsons Street c. 1915

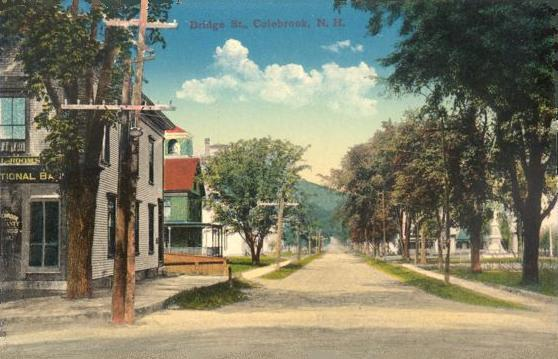
Bridge Street c. 1915

== Geography ==
Colebrook is the hub of northern Coos County. Roads from Maine, Vermont, and Quebec all converge in the center of town. To the north is Stewartstown, to the east is Dixville and to the south is Columbia. Lemington, Vermont, is located to the west of town, across the Connecticut River.

U.S. Route 3 passes through the center of Colebrook, leading north to West Stewartstown and south through Columbia to Groveton. New Hampshire Route 145 has its southern terminus at US 3 in Colebrook and is the most direct route north to Pittsburg. New Hampshire Route 26 also runs through the center of Colebrook, leading west to its terminus in Lemington, Vermont, and east through Dixville Notch to Errol.

According to the United States Census Bureau, the town of Colebrook has a total area of 40.7 square miles (105.5 km^{2}), of which 40.5 square miles (104.9 km^{2}) are land and 0.2 square miles (0.5 km^{2}) are water, comprising 0.51% of the town. The highest point in Colebrook is Van Dyck Mountain, elevation 2,760 feet (840 m), in the northeastern corner of the town. Colebrook's western view is dominated by Monadnock Mountain, elevation 3,148 ft (960 m), in Lemington. Colebrook is drained by the Mohawk River, which flows into the Connecticut River. Beaver Brook joins the Mohawk from the north in Colebrook village. The town lies almost fully within the Connecticut River watershed, with a tiny portion of the northeastern corner of town lying in the Androscoggin River watershed.

=== Climate ===
Colebrook has a humid continental climate (Köppen Dfb) with warm summer days and mild nights but severely cold winters with high diurnal temperature variation. Snowfall is high during winter, similar to most of Northeastern United States, but a long-lasting snow pack is formed due to the persistently cold temperatures. Average winter lows are only narrowly above 0 °F, according to NOAA's weather station normals.

Climate data for Colebrook, New Hampshire, 1991–2020 normals, extremes 1960–present: 1120ft (341m)
| Month | Jan | Feb | Mar | Apr | May | Jun | Jul | Aug | Sep | Oct | Nov | Dec | Year |
|---|---|---|---|---|---|---|---|---|---|---|---|---|---|
| Record high °F (°C) | 61 (16) | 63 (17) | 79 (26) | 86 (30) | 91 (33) | 94 (34) | 94 (34) | 95 (35) | 94 (34) | 81 (27) | 73 (23) | 65 (18) | 95 (35) |
| Mean maximum °F (°C) | 46.9 (8.3) | 49.9 (9.9) | 58.0 (14.4) | 74.4 (23.6) | 82.8 (28.2) | 86.8 (30.4) | 87.1 (30.6) | 85.7 (29.8) | 82.8 (28.2) | 74.0 (23.3) | 63.9 (17.7) | 50.1 (10.1) | 89.3 (31.8) |
| Mean daily maximum °F (°C) | 24.3 (−4.3) | 27.0 (−2.8) | 36.2 (2.3) | 50.0 (10.0) | 64.0 (17.8) | 72.4 (22.4) | 77.0 (25.0) | 75.6 (24.2) | 68.2 (20.1) | 54.9 (12.7) | 41.5 (5.3) | 29.8 (−1.2) | 51.7 (11.0) |
| Daily mean °F (°C) | 12.3 (−10.9) | 13.6 (−10.2) | 23.7 (−4.6) | 37.8 (3.2) | 50.7 (10.4) | 59.9 (15.5) | 64.7 (18.2) | 62.9 (17.2) | 55.6 (13.1) | 43.4 (6.3) | 31.6 (−0.2) | 20.0 (−6.7) | 39.7 (4.3) |
| Mean daily minimum °F (°C) | 0.3 (−17.6) | 0.2 (−17.7) | 11.2 (−11.6) | 25.7 (−3.5) | 37.4 (3.0) | 47.4 (8.6) | 52.4 (11.3) | 50.2 (10.1) | 43.0 (6.1) | 31.8 (−0.1) | 21.7 (−5.7) | 10.2 (−12.1) | 27.6 (−2.4) |
| Mean minimum °F (°C) | −23.3 (−30.7) | −20.4 (−29.1) | −13.2 (−25.1) | 11.9 (−11.2) | 24.7 (−4.1) | 33.7 (0.9) | 41.5 (5.3) | 39.5 (4.2) | 29.6 (−1.3) | 19.8 (−6.8) | 4.7 (−15.2) | −12.8 (−24.9) | −26.8 (−32.7) |
| Record low °F (°C) | −40 (−40) | −42 (−41) | −29 (−34) | −8 (−22) | 17 (−8) | 27 (−3) | 31 (−1) | 29 (−2) | 18 (−8) | 7 (−14) | −13 (−25) | −38 (−39) | −42 (−41) |
| Average precipitation inches (mm) | 2.71 (69) | 2.04 (52) | 2.49 (63) | 2.86 (73) | 3.99 (101) | 4.68 (119) | 4.25 (108) | 4.22 (107) | 3.40 (86) | 4.39 (112) | 3.13 (80) | 3.11 (79) | 41.27 (1,049) |
| Average snowfall inches (cm) | 18.2 (46) | 19.9 (51) | 14.5 (37) | 3.4 (8.6) | 0.1 (0.25) | 0.0 (0.0) | 0.0 (0.0) | 0.0 (0.0) | 0.0 (0.0) | 0.9 (2.3) | 5.9 (15) | 18.5 (47) | 81.4 (207.15) |
| Average extreme snow depth inches (cm) | 13.4 (34) | 16.0 (41) | 14.3 (36) | 6.3 (16) | 0.2 (0.51) | 0.0 (0.0) | 0.0 (0.0) | 0.0 (0.0) | 0.0 (0.0) | 0.7 (1.8) | 3.5 (8.9) | 10.3 (26) | 20.3 (52) |
| Average precipitation days (≥ 0.01 in) | 12.7 | 10.0 | 10.1 | 10.1 | 11.7 | 13.5 | 13.0 | 11.9 | 10.8 | 13.0 | 13.1 | 14.6 | 144.5 |
| Average snowy days (≥ 0.1 in) | 11.5 | 10.0 | 6.9 | 2.3 | 0.1 | 0.0 | 0.0 | 0.0 | 0.0 | 0.5 | 5.1 | 11.6 | 48.0 |
Source 1: NOAA
Source 2: XMACIS (temp records & monthly max/mins)

== Demographics ==
Historical population
| Census | Pop. | Note | %± |
|---|---|---|---|
| 1790 | 29 | | — |
| 1800 | 160 | | 451.7% |
| 1810 | 325 | | 103.1% |
| 1820 | 469 | | 44.3% |
| 1830 | 542 | | 15.6% |
| 1840 | 743 | | 37.1% |
| 1850 | 908 | | 22.2% |
| 1860 | 1,118 | | 23.1% |
| 1870 | 1,372 | | 22.7% |
| 1880 | 1,580 | | 15.2% |
| 1890 | 1,736 | | 9.9% |
| 1900 | 1,876 | | 8.1% |
| 1910 | 1,905 | | 1.5% |
| 1920 | 1,811 | | −4.9% |
| 1930 | 1,937 | | 7.0% |
| 1940 | 2,096 | | 8.2% |
| 1950 | 2,116 | | 1.0% |
| 1960 | 2,389 | | 12.9% |
| 1970 | 2,094 | | −12.3% |
| 1980 | 2,459 | | 17.4% |
| 1990 | 2,444 | | −0.6% |
| 2000 | 2,321 | | −5.0% |
| 2010 | 2,301 | | −0.9% |
| 2020 | 2,084 | | −9.4% |
U.S. Decennial Census

At the first census of 1790 there were 29 residents.

As of the census of 2010, there were 2,301 people, 1,073 households, and 612 families residing in the town. There were 1,429 housing units, of which 356, or 24.9%, were vacant. 245 of the vacant units were for seasonal or recreational use. The racial makeup of the town was 97.4% white, 0.2% African American, 0.3% Native American, 0.7% Asian, 0.0% Native Hawaiian or Pacific Islander, 0.2% some other race, and 1.2% from two or more races. 1.2% of the population were Hispanic or Latino of any race.

Of the 1,073 households, 24.3% had children under the age of 18 living with them, 43.9% were headed by married couples living together, 9.3% had a female householder with no husband present, and 43.0% were non-families. 36.2% of all households were made up of individuals, and 17.9% were someone living alone who was 65 years of age or older. The average household size was 2.14, and the average family size was 2.73.

In the town, 19.5% of the population were under the age of 18, 6.2% were from 18 to 24, 22.8% from 25 to 44, 31.9% from 45 to 64, and 19.6% were 65 years of age or older. The median age was 45.8 years. For every 100 females, there were 97.0 males. For every 100 females age 18 and over, there were 95.7 males.

For the period 2011–2015, the estimated median annual income for a household was $45,375, and the median income for a family was $54,063. Male full-time workers had a median income of $38,295 versus $35,637 for females. The per capita income for the town was $25,383. 17.3% of the population and 8.5% of families were below the poverty line. 30.3% of the population under the age of 18 and 3.5% of those 65 or older were living in poverty.

== Media ==
The Colebrook Chronicle, founded 2000, publishes on Fridays. The Chronicle embeds a weekly video newscast each Friday in its website.

== Sites of interest ==
- Beaver Brook Falls Wayside
- Colebrook Area Historical Society & Museum, located in the Town Hall building

== Notable people ==
- Irving W. Drew (1845–1922), US senator
- Chester B. Jordan (1839–1914), 48th governor of New Hampshire
- Horace White (1834–1916), co-owner and editor-in-chief of the Chicago Tribune

== Adjacent municipalities ==
- Stewartstown (north)
- Dixville (east)
- Columbia (south)
- Lemington, Vermont (southwest)
- Canaan, Vermont (northwest)

== See also ==
- List of colonial governors of New Hampshire
