= Mohawk River (New Hampshire) =

River in New Hampshire, United States

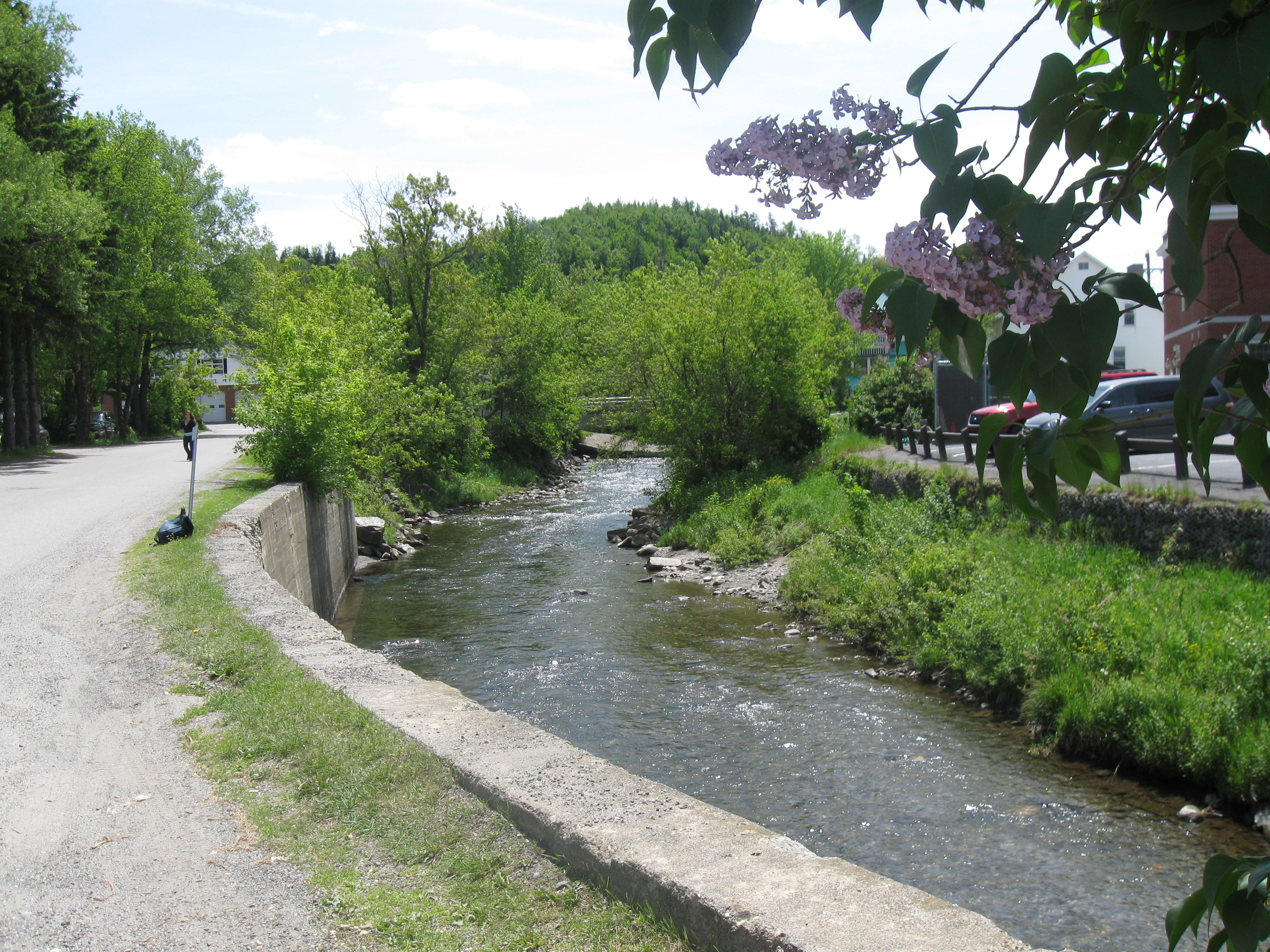
- The Mohawk River entering Colebrook

- Location within New Hampshire Location within the United States

Location
- Country: United States
- State: New Hampshire
- County: Coos
- Towns: Dixville, Colebrook

Physical characteristics
- Source: Lake Gloriette
  - location: Dixville Notch
  - coordinates: 44°52′02″N 71°18′27″W
  - elevation: 1,846 ft (563 m)
- Mouth: Connecticut River
  - location: Colebrook
  - coordinates: 44°54′02″N 71°30′17″W
  - elevation: 995 ft (303 m)
- Length: 13.8 mi (22.2 km)

Basin features
- Tributaries
  - left: Roaring Brook
  - right: Moose Brook, West Branch, Read Brook, Beaver Brook

The Mohawk River is a 13.8-mile-long (22.2 km) river in northern New Hampshire in the United States. It is a tributary of the Connecticut River, which flows south to Long Island Sound, an arm of the Atlantic Ocean.

The Mohawk River rises at the outlet of Lake Gloriette in Dixville Notch and flows west-northwest to the Connecticut River in the town of Colebrook. It is paralleled for most of its length by New Hampshire Route 26.

== See also ==
- List of New Hampshire rivers
