= Beecher Falls, Vermont =

Census-designated place in Vermont, United States

- Census-designated place
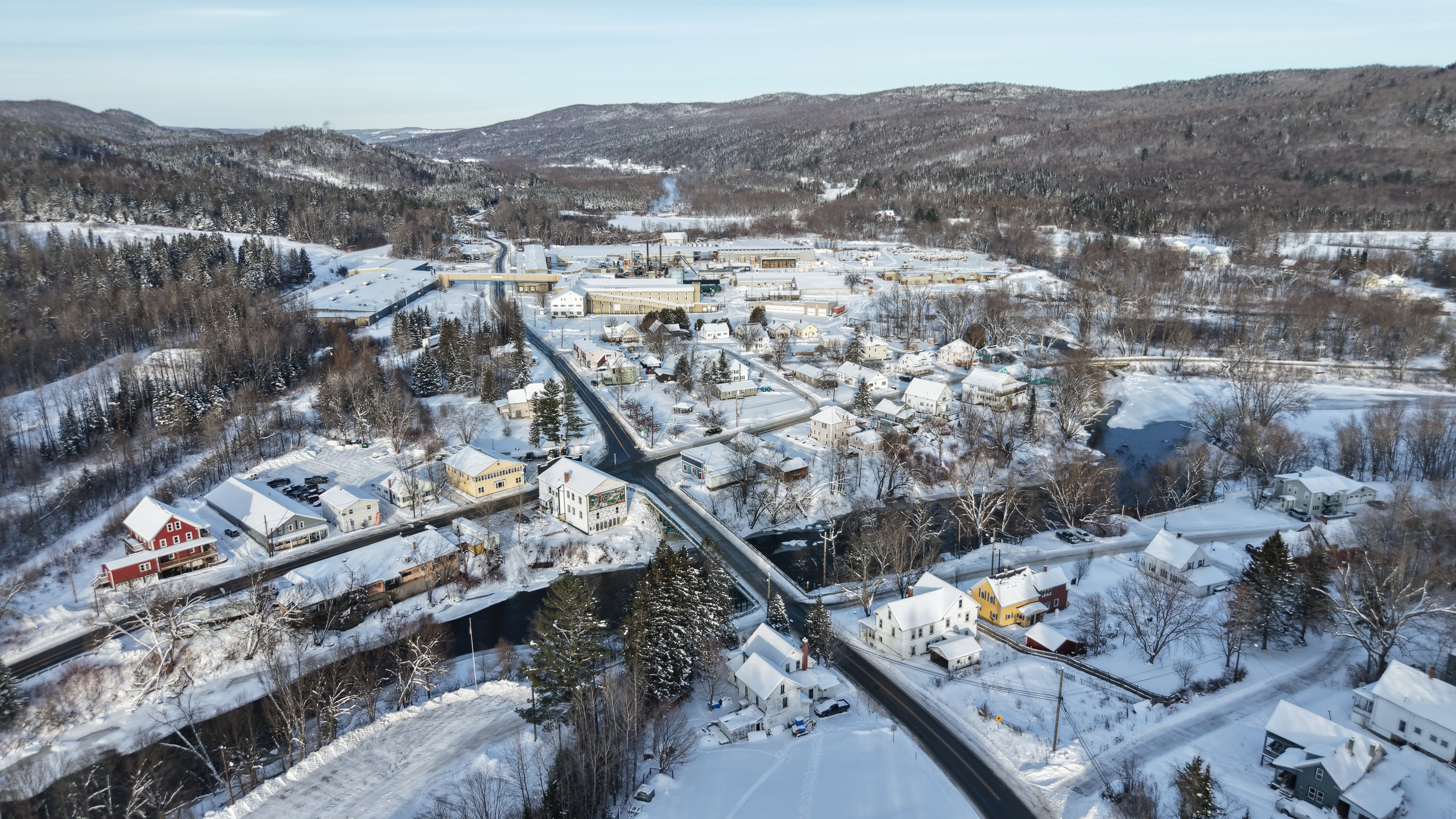
- Beecher Falls, VT, from the south

- Location in Essex County and the state of Vermont
- Coordinates: 45°00′34″N 71°30′02″W
- Country: United States
- State: Vermont
- County: Essex
- Town: Canaan

Area
  - Total: 1.310 sq mi (3.39 km^{2})
  - Land: 1.262 sq mi (3.27 km^{2})
  - Water: 0.048 sq mi (0.12 km^{2})
- Elevation: 1,102 ft (336 m)

Population (2020)
  - Total: 139
  - Density: 110/sq mi (42.5/km^{2})
- Time zone: UTC-5 (Eastern (EST))
  - Summer (DST): UTC-4 (EDT)
- ZIP code: 05902
- Area code: 802
- GNIS feature ID: 2586618

Beecher Falls is a census-designated place in the town of Canaan, Essex County, Vermont, United States. Beecher Falls is located on the Connecticut River across from Stewartstown, New Hampshire, in the northeast corner of Vermont. Its population was 139 as of the 2020 census. The Beecher Falls–East Hereford Border Crossing, a port of entry with Canada, is located here.
