= Stewartstown, New Hampshire =

- Town
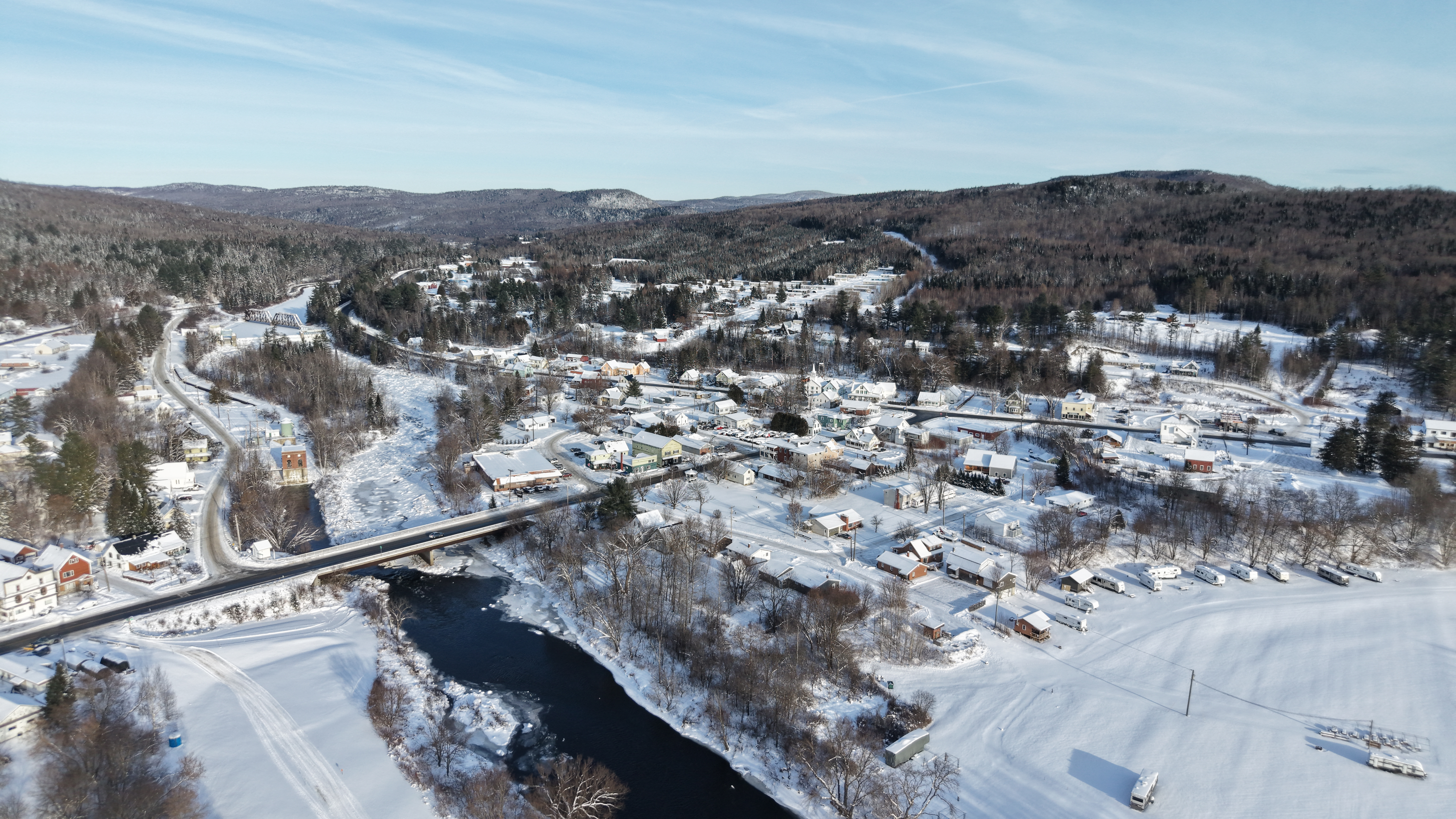
- Stewartstown, NH, from the southwest

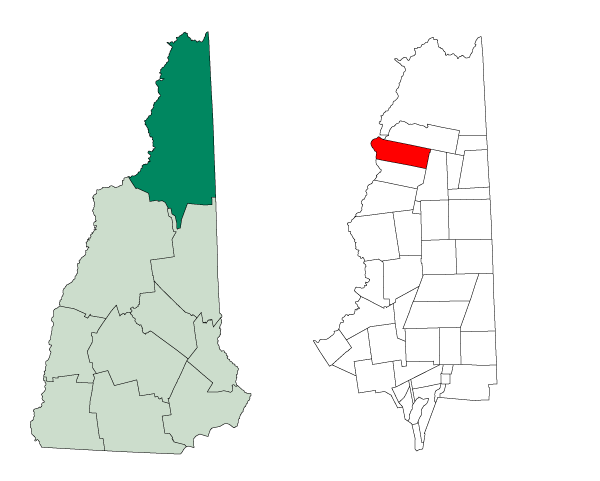
- Location in Coös County, New Hampshire
- Coordinates: 44°57′39″N 71°24′49″W
- Country: United States
- State: New Hampshire
- County: Coös
- Incorporated: 1795
- Villages: Stewartstown; West Stewartstown; Stewartstown Hollow

Area
  - Total: 46.9 sq mi (121.4 km^{2})
  - Land: 46.3 sq mi (119.8 km^{2})
  - Water: 0.62 sq mi (1.6 km^{2}) 1.30%
- Elevation: 1,864 ft (568 m)

Population (2020)
  - Total: 813
  - Density: 18/sq mi (6.8/km^{2})
- Time zone: UTC-5 (Eastern)
  - Summer (DST): UTC-4 (Eastern)
- ZIP code: 03576 (Stewartstown); 03597 (West Stewartstown)
- Area code: 603
- FIPS code: 33-73380
- GNIS feature ID: 871096

Stewartstown is a town in Coös County, New Hampshire, United States. The population was 813 at the 2020 census, down from 1,004 at the 2010 census. It includes the village of West Stewartstown and is part of the Berlin, NH-VT Micropolitan Statistical Area.

== History ==
Stewartstown was granted in 1770 and incorporated in 1795. Originally named "Stuart" after Sir John Stuart, 3rd Earl of Bute, it was incorporated as "Stewartstown" after the Revolutionary War, following the original Scottish spelling of the name.

== Geography ==
According to the United States Census Bureau, the town has a total area of 46.9 square miles (121.4 km^{2}), of which 46.3 square miles (119.8 km^{2}) are land and 0.6 square miles (1.6 km^{2}) are water, comprising 1.30% of the town. The highest point is the summit of Sugar Hill, at 2,985 feet (910 m) above sea level, near the town's southeastern corner. The 45th parallel north passes through the town.

The primary settlement in the town is the village of West Stewartstown on U.S. Route 3 along the Connecticut River, opposite the town of Canaan, Vermont. Stewartstown village is one mile northeast of West Stewartstown, along Route 3 and opposite the village of Beecher Falls, Vermont. To the east, the village of Stewartstown Hollow is closer to the geographic center of the town, along New Hampshire Route 145.

=== Adjacent municipalities ===
- Clarksville (north)
- Dixville (east)
- Colebrook (south)
- Canaan, Vermont (west)

== Demographics ==
Historical population
Census	Pop.	Note	%±
1800	99		—
1810	186		87.9%
1820	363		95.2%
1830	129		−64.5%
1840	630		388.4%
1850	747		18.6%
1860	771		3.2%
1870	909		17.9%
1880	958		5.4%
1890	1,002		4.6%
1900	1,150		14.8%
1910	1,128		−1.9%
1920	1,109		−1.7%
1930	1,148		3.5%
1940	1,203		4.8%
1950	970		−19.4%
1960	918		−5.4%
1970	1,008		9.8%
1980	943		−6.4%
1990	1,048		11.1%
2000	1,012		−3.4%
2010	1,004		−0.8%
2020	813		−19.0%
U.S. Decennial Census

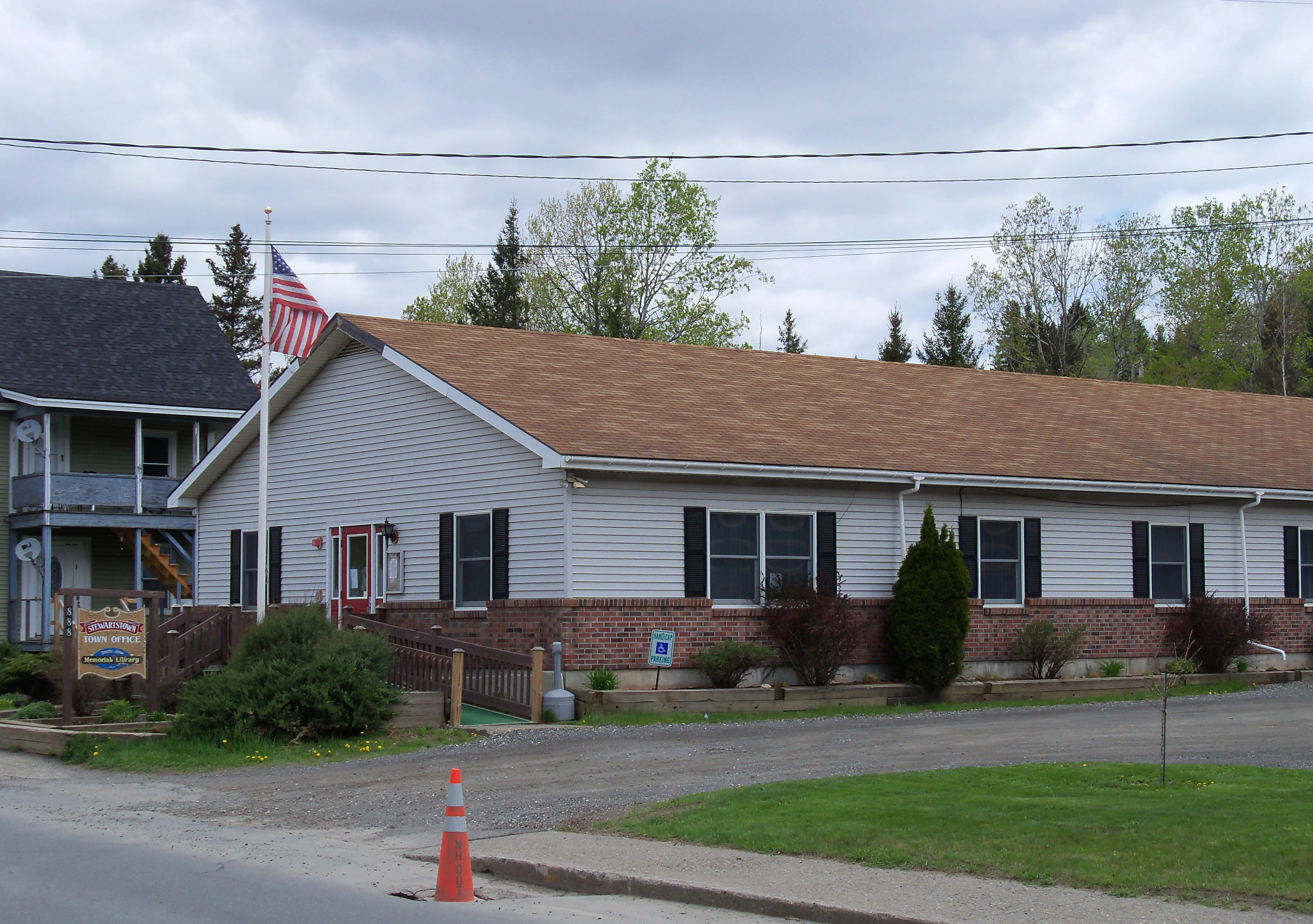
Stewartstown Town Office

At the 2000 census there were 1,012 people, 371 households, and 241 families living in the town. The population density was 21.8 people per square mile (8.4/km^{2}). There were 760 housing units at an average density of 16.4 per square mile (6.3/km^{2}). The racial makeup of the town was 99.11% White, 0.10% Native American, and 0.79% from two or more races. Hispanic or Latino of any race were 0.10%.

Of the 371 households 31.5% had children under the age of 18 living with them, 50.4% were married couples living together, 7.8% had a female householder with no husband present, and 34.8% were non-families. 27.8% of households were one person and 9.7% were one person aged 65 or older. The average household size was 2.42 and the average family size was 2.91.

The age distribution was 23.1% under the age of 18, 7.5% from 18 to 24, 27.3% from 25 to 44, 24.4% from 45 to 64, and 17.7% 65 or older. The median age was 39 years. For every 100 females, there were 106.1 males. For every 100 females age 18 and over, there were 106.9 males.

The median household income was $30,700 and the median family income was $34,911. Males had a median income of $29,286 versus $21,313 for females. The per capita income for the town was $17,231. About 9.0% of families and 11.5% of the population were below the poverty line, including 12.3% of those under age 18 and 14.4% of those age 65 or over.

== Notable person ==
- Metallak (c. 1727–1847), Androscoggin elder (burial place)

== See also ==
- New Hampshire Historical Marker No. 47: Metallak
- New Hampshire Historical Marker No. 64: 45th Parallel
