= List of populated places on the Connecticut River =

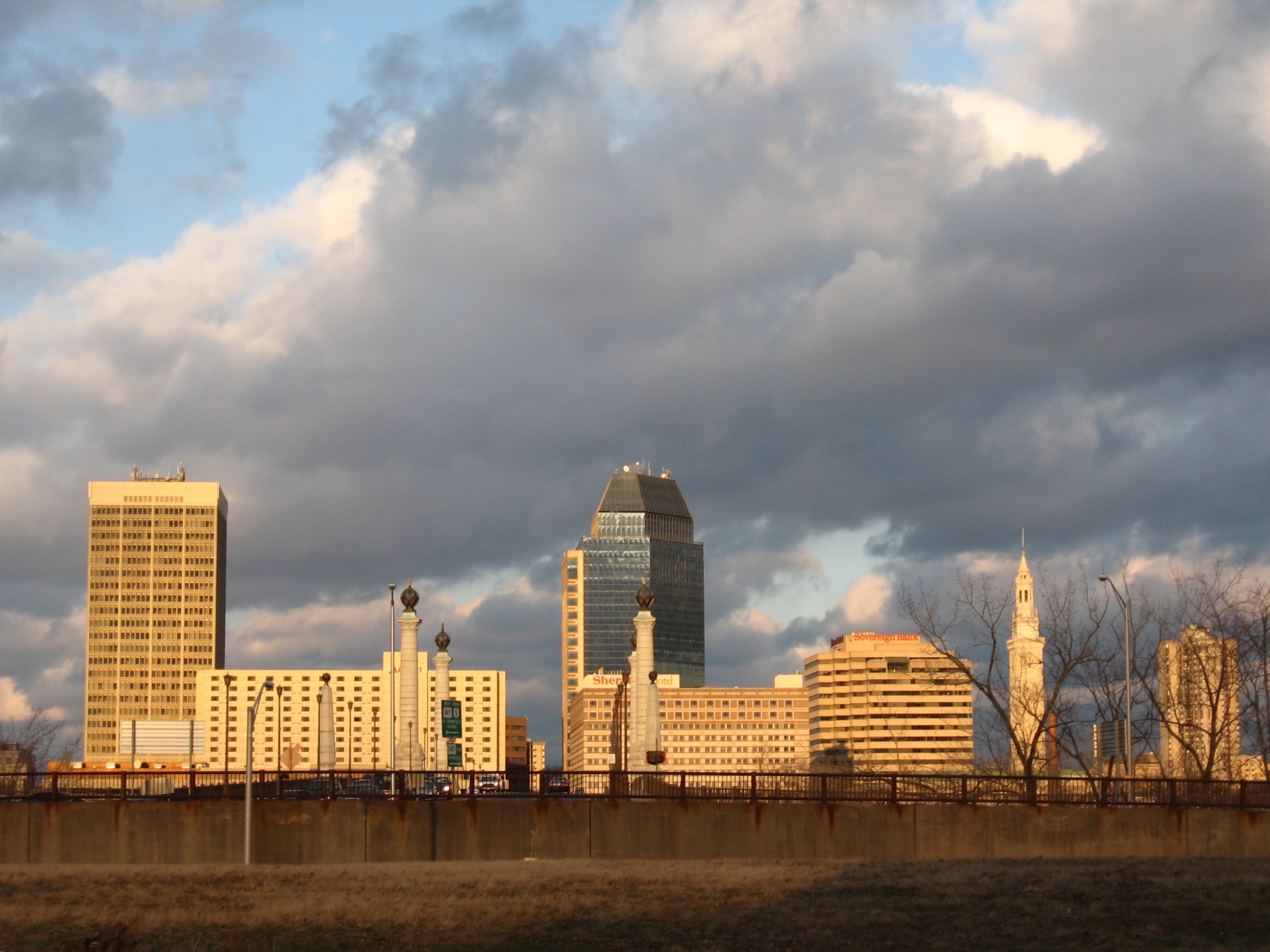
Springfield, Massachusetts

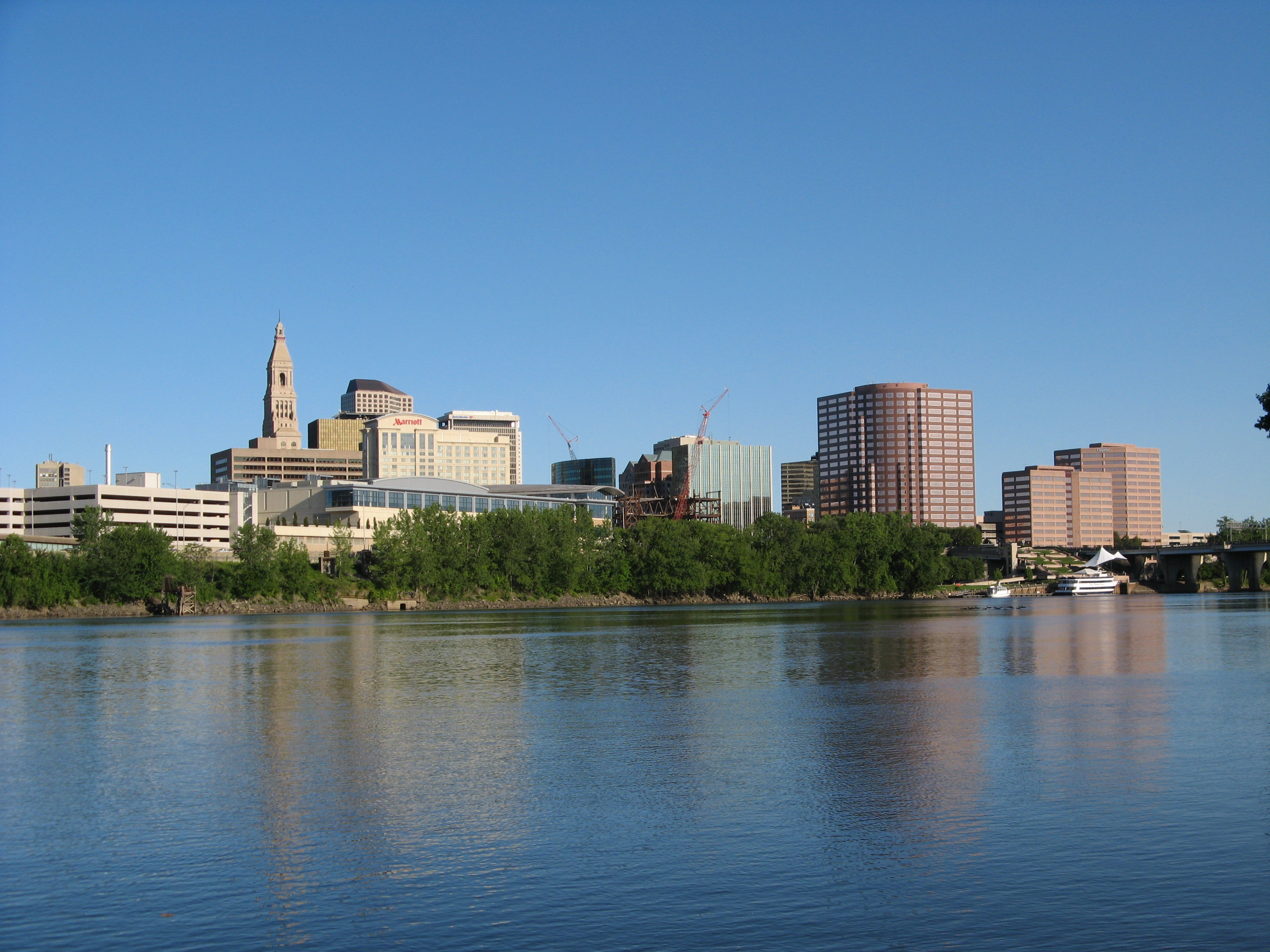
Hartford, Connecticut

The two primary cities of the Connecticut River

This is a list of populated places that are on the Connecticut River.

== Upper Connecticut River ==
Bold communities have over 10,000 population.

=== New Hampshire ===
- Pittsburg
- Clarksville
- Stewartstown
  - West Stewartstown
- Colebrook
- Columbia
  - Tinkerville
- Stratford
  - North Stratford
- Northumberland
- Lancaster
- Dalton
- Littleton
- Monroe
- Bath
- Haverhill
  - Woodsville
  - North Haverhill
- Piermont
- Orford
- Lyme
- Hanover
- Lebanon
  - West Lebanon
- Plainfield
- Cornish
  - Balloch
- Claremont
- Charlestown
- Walpole
  - North Walpole
- Westmoreland
- Chesterfield
- Hinsdale

=== Vermont ===
- Canaan
  - Beecher Falls
- Lemington
- Bloomfield
- Brunswick
- Maidstone
- Guildhall
- Lunenburg
- Concord
- Waterford
- Barnet
  - McIndoe Falls
- Ryegate
- Newbury
  - Wells River
- Bradford
- Fairlee
- Thetford
- Norwich
  - Lewiston
- Hartford
  - Wilder
  - White River Junction
- Hartland
  - North Hartland
- Windsor
- Weathersfield
  - Ascutney
- Springfield
- Rockingham
  - Bellows Falls
- Westminster
  - North Westminster
- Putney
- Dummerston
- Brattleboro
- Vernon

== Middle Connecticut River ==
Bold cities have over 15,000 population. Italics are for towns or cities in the Springfield Metro area. Underlines are for communities in the Hartford Metro area.

=== Massachusetts ===
- Northfield
- Gill
- Erving
- Montague
  - Turners Falls
- Greenfield
- Deerfield
- Sunderland
- Whately
- Hatfield
- Hadley
  - North Hadley
- Northampton
- Easthampton
  - Mount Tom
- South Hadley
- Holyoke
- Chicopee
- West Springfield
- Springfield
- Agawam
- Longmeadow

=== Connecticut ===
- Suffield
- Enfield
  - Thompsonville
- Windsor Locks
- East Windsor
- Windsor
- South Windsor

== Lower Connecticut River (Connecticut only) ==
Bold communities have over 25,000 population. This section of the river is completely in the Hartford Metro area.

- Hartford
- East Hartford
  - Hockanum
- Wethersfield
- Glastonbury
  - South Glastonbury
- Rocky Hill
- Cromwell
- Portland
- Middletown
- East Hampton
  - Middle Haddam
- Haddam
  - Higganum
- East Haddam
- Chester
- Lyme
- Deep River
- Essex
- Old Lyme
- Old Saybrook

== See also ==
- List of crossings of the Connecticut River
