= Beatties, New Hampshire =

Unincorporated community in New Hampshire, United States

- Unincorporated community
- Location within New Hampshire Location within the United States
- Coordinates: 44°42′11″N 71°35′39″W
- Country: United States
- State: New Hampshire
- County: Coos
- Town: Stratford
- Elevation: 991 ft (302 m)
- Time zone: UTC-5 (Eastern)
  - Summer (DST): UTC-4 (Eastern)
- GNIS feature ID: 871157

Beatties is a small unincorporated community in the town of Stratford in Coos County, New Hampshire, United States. It is located 15 miles (24 km) north of Lancaster and 10 miles (16 km) south of Columbia along U.S. Route 3 near the Connecticut River at an elevation of 991 feet (302 m).
