= Wallace Farm =

Wallace Farm may refer to:

- Wallace-Alford Farmstead, Midway, Kentucky, listed on the National Register of Historic Places in Woodford County, Kentucky
- Wallace Farm (Columbia, New Hampshire), listed on the National Register of Historic Places in New Hampshire
- Wallace Farm (Cuyahoga Valley National Park), listed on the National Register of Historic Places in Summit County, Ohio
