= Maidstone (disambiguation) =

Maidstone is the county town of Kent, England.

Maidstone may also refer to:

== Places ==
=== United Kingdom ===
- Borough of Maidstone, a borough in Kent, England, administrative centre Maidstone
  - Maidstone (UK Parliament constituency), former constituency
  - Maidstone United F.C., the borough's association football team
  - HM Prison Maidstone, a men's prison located in the borough
  - Maidstone Airport, Kent, a former airport serving the town between 1917 and 1969

=== Canada ===
- Maidstone, Ontario in Essex County, Ontario
- Maidstone Township, Ontario also in Essex County, Ontario
- Maidstone, Saskatchewan in Canada
  - Maidstone Aerodrome, serving the town

=== United States ===
- Maidstone, Vermont
- Maidstone State Park in Maidstone, Vermont
- Maidstone Golf Club in East Hampton, New York
- Maidstone (Owings, Maryland) one of the oldest houses in Maryland

=== Other places ===
- Maidstone, Victoria, Australia
- Maidstone Park, a sports ground in Upper Hutt in New Zealand
- Maidstone Road a small residential street in Tokwawan, Kowloon, Hong Kong
- Maidstone, Jamaica a Free Village in Manchester parish, Jamaica
- Maidstone, KwaZulu Natal, South Africa; See All Saints Church, Maidstone, KwaZulu-Natal

== Other uses ==
- Maidstone (film), a 1970 film by Norman Mailer

== See also ==
- HMS Maidstone, several ships
