= Edward J. Daley =

American athlete and coach (1887–1955)

Biographical details
- Born: September 10, 1887; North Stratford, New Hampshire, U.S.
- Died: June 21, 1955 (aged 67); Detroit, Michigan, U.S.

Playing career

Football
- 1908–1911: Dartmouth

Baseball
- 1909–1912: Dartmouth
- Positions: End (football); Outfielder (baseball)

Coaching career (HC unless noted)

Football
- 1912–1913: Colby

Baseball
- 1913–1914: Colby

Edward John Daley (September 10, 1887 – June 21, 1955) was an American athlete and coach who played baseball and football at Dartmouth College and coached both sports at Colby College.

== Athletics ==
Daley was born on September 10, 1887, in North Stratford, New Hampshire, to Edward and Bridget (O'Dowd) Daley. He entered the Dean Academy in 1905 and made the football team as a left end, but eventually transitioned to quarterback. He was also a member of the baseball team for three seasons. In 1908, he entered Dartmouth College and made the football team as a freshman. He was the backup left end behind captain Harry Kennedy his freshman year and took over as starter the following season. Daley was the starting center fielder for the Dartmouth baseball team in 1909 and batted .333. He moved to right field for his final three seasons. Due to an eye injury, his batting average fell to .250 in 1910, but he finished the following season with a .369 average. On November 18, 1910, Daley was elected captain of the Dartmouth football team for the 1911 season. On June 27, 1911, he was elected captain of the baseball team for the 1912 season. He was the first Dartmouth athlete since Johnny Glaze in 1907–08 to captain both teams. In 1912, Daley became a physical instructor and football and baseball coach at Colby College.

== Later life ==
In 1916, Daley was elected register of deeds for Coös County, New Hampshire. He was one of only six Democrats elected to New Hampshire's 80 county offices in that election. During World War I, he served in the Student Army Training Corps at Harvard University. He was captain of the Harvard SATC football team in 1918. After the war, he worked in auto sales in Springfield, Massachusetts, and Hartford, Connecticut.

In 1923, he married Margery Harris Grannis of Lancaster, New Hampshire. They had two children.

Daley spent the last fifteen years of his life as the probation officer for the Recorder's Court in Detroit, Michigan. He died on June 21, 1955, in Detroit.
