= William E. Holyoke =

United States Navy Medal of Honor recipient (1868–1934)

- Born: March 13, 1868; Groveton, New Hampshire, U.S.
- Died: April 3, 1934 (aged 66)
- Military career
- Allegiance: United States
- Branch: United States Navy
- Rank: Boatswain's Mate First Class
- Conflicts: Boxer Rebellion
- Awards: Medal of Honor

William Edward Holyoke (March 13, 1868 – April 3, 1934) was an American sailor serving in the United States Navy during the Boxer Rebellion who received the Medal of Honor for bravery.

== Biography ==
Holyoke was born March 13, 1868, in Groveton, New Hampshire, and after entering the navy he was sent as a Boatswain's Mate First Class to China to fight in the Boxer Rebellion.

He died April 3, 1934.

== Medal of Honor citation ==
Rank and organization: Boatswain's Mate First Class, U.S. Navy. Born: 13 March 1868, Groveton, N.H. Accredited to: Illinois. G.O. No.: 55, 19 July 1901.

Citation:

In action with the relief expedition of the allied forces in China, 13, 20, 21 and 22 June 1900. During this period and in the presence of the enemy, Holyoke distinguished himself by meritorious conduct.

== See also ==
- List of Medal of Honor recipients
- List of Medal of Honor recipients for the Boxer Rebellion
