= Groveton, New Hampshire =

Census-designated place in New Hampshire, United States

- Census-designated place
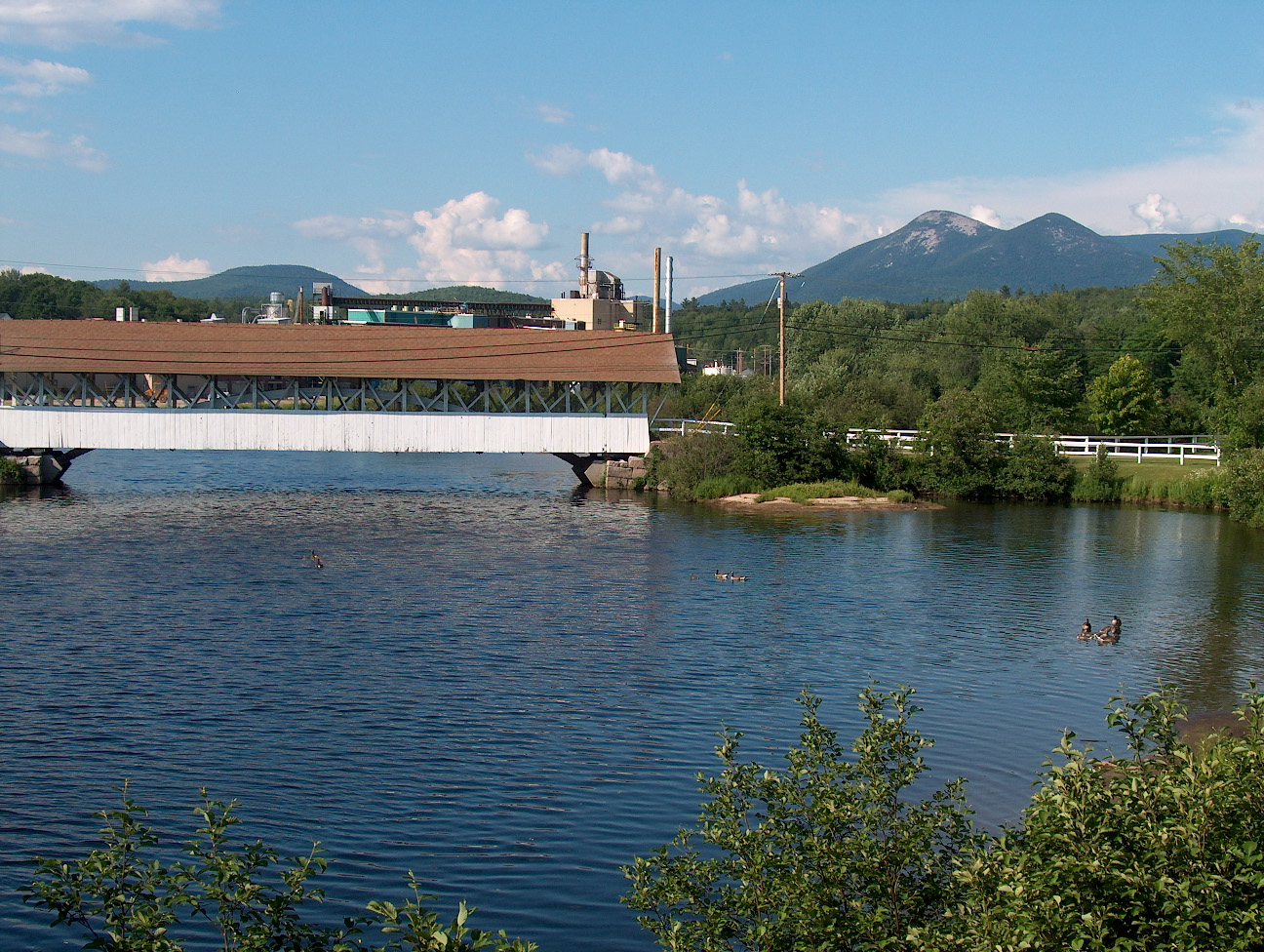
- Covered bridge over the Upper Ammonoosuc River in front of former paper mill in Groveton. The Percy Peaks are in the distance.

- Location within New Hampshire Location within the United States
- Coordinates: 44°35′55″N 71°30′40″W
- Country: United States
- State: New Hampshire
- County: Coos
- Town: Northumberland

Area
  - Total: 2.15 sq mi (5.57 km^{2})
  - Land: 2.06 sq mi (5.33 km^{2})
  - Water: 0.089 sq mi (0.23 km^{2})
- Elevation: 899 ft (274 m)

Population (2020)
  - Total: 1,068
  - Density: 518.5/sq mi (200.19/km^{2})
- Time zone: UTC-5 (Eastern (EST))
  - Summer (DST): UTC-4 (EDT)
- ZIP code: 03582
- Area code: 603
- FIPS code: 33-32260
- GNIS feature ID: 2378067

Groveton is a census-designated place (CDP) and the primary village in the town of Northumberland, New Hampshire, United States. The population was 1,068 at the 2020 census. It is located at the intersection of U.S. Route 3 and New Hampshire Route 110.

== History ==
=== Fort Wentworth ===
Fort Wentworth was a colonial fort built in 1755 at the junction of the Upper Ammonoosuc River and Connecticut River, in Northumberland, New Hampshire, just downstream from the present site of Groveton.

=== Paper mill ===
Diamond International Papers was originally the hub of Groveton. Diamond International was replaced by James River Paper Company, which was followed by Wausau Paper. In 2008 Wausau ceased production in its Groveton mill, which in turn precluded the trains from stopping in Groveton.

There were plans to turn the mill into a biomass plant, but as of January 2012, plans for buying the mill had fallen through. After an interview with former mill employees, the town of Northumberland decided to demolish the mill for scrap metals. With the price of metals at an all-time high, the town would make more money with the metals than waiting for the mill to sell. Plans for the future site included an LNG plant, which would have brought 80 or so jobs to the North Country. However, the planned development did not materialize.

=== Hydrogen power plant ===
Q Hydrogen, in conjunction with state and local political and development officials, is a developer of a hydrogen production system using water.

Electricity production has begun at the site of the old paper mill, which has been scraped clean of most evidence that the 140-acre (57 ha) facility existed there.

=== Steam locomotive ===
A coal-powered steam locomotive originally owned by the Odell Manufacturing Company paper mill is publicly displayed as a tourist attraction. Having last seen use in the mid-1960s, it is presently maintained by Wausau Mills and Groveton Paper Board. The community beautification committee "dresses it up" every Christmas and maintains the surrounding area.

=== Riverside Speedway and Adventure Park ===
In 1964, Riverside Speedway, a 1/4 mile banked oval track, opened in Groveton. In late 2014 the speedway was purchased and underwent a name change. It was sold again in late 2019 and renamed Riverside Speedway and Adventure Park.

== Geography ==
Groveton is located in the northern part of the town of Northumberland in western Coos County. It lies on the northwestern side of the Upper Ammonoosuc River, approximately one mile east of the river's mouth at the Connecticut River, which forms the New Hampshire/Vermont border.

U.S. Route 3 passes through Groveton, leading north 26 miles (42 km) to Colebrook and south 10 miles (16 km) to Lancaster, the Coos County seat. New Hampshire Route 110 branches east from US 3 on the southern edge of Groveton and leads east, then southeast 26 miles (42 km) to Berlin.

According to the United States Census Bureau, the Groveton CDP has a total area of 2.15 square miles (5.57 km^{2}), of which 2.06 square miles (5.33 km^{2}) are land and 0.089 square miles (0.23 km^{2}), or 4.16%, are water.

== Demographics ==
Historical population
Census	Pop.	Note	%±
1950	1,918		—
1960	2,004		4.5%
1970	1,597		−20.3%
1980	1,389		−13.0%
1990	1,255		−9.6%
2000	1,197		−4.6%
2010	1,118		−6.6%
2020	1,068		−4.5%
U.S. Decennial Census

Groveton is part of the Berlin, NH-VT Micropolitan Statistical Area. As of the 2010 US Census, there were 1,118 people, 491 households, and 300 families residing in the CDP. There were 550 housing units, of which 59, or 10.7%, were vacant. The racial makeup of the CDP was 98.9% white, 0.1% Native American, 0.2% Asian, and 0.8% two or more races. 0.6% of the population were Hispanic or Latino of any race.

Of the 491 households in the CDP, 29.3% had children under the age of 18 living with them, 43.6% were headed by married couples living together, 11.2% had a female householder with no husband present, and 38.9% were non-families. 31.8% of all households were made up of individuals, and 16.5% were someone living alone who was 65 years of age or older. The average household size was 2.28, and the average family size was 2.83.

22.9% of residents in the CDP were under the age of 18, 7.8% were from age 18 to 24, 23.1% were from 25 to 44, 28.2% were from 45 to 64, and 18.4% were 65 years of age or older. The median age was 41.9 years. For every 100 females, there were 93.8 males. For every 100 females age 18 and over, there were 90.3 males.

For the period 2011–15, the estimated median annual income for a household was $36,250, and the median income for a family was $51,563. Male full-time workers had a median income of $36,906 versus $26,083 for females. The per capita income for the CDP was $19,504. 9.3% of the population and 5.2% of families were below the poverty line, along with 12.8% of people under the age of 18 and 6.9% of people 65 or older.

== Education ==
Groveton High School, located on State Street (US 3) at the north end of town, serves Groveton and the towns of Northumberland, Stark, Guildhall and Stratford.

== Notable people ==
- GG Allin (1956–1993), punk rock musician
- Fred N. Cummings (1864–1952), US congressman from Colorado
