= Alma Carrie Cummings =

American journalist and editor

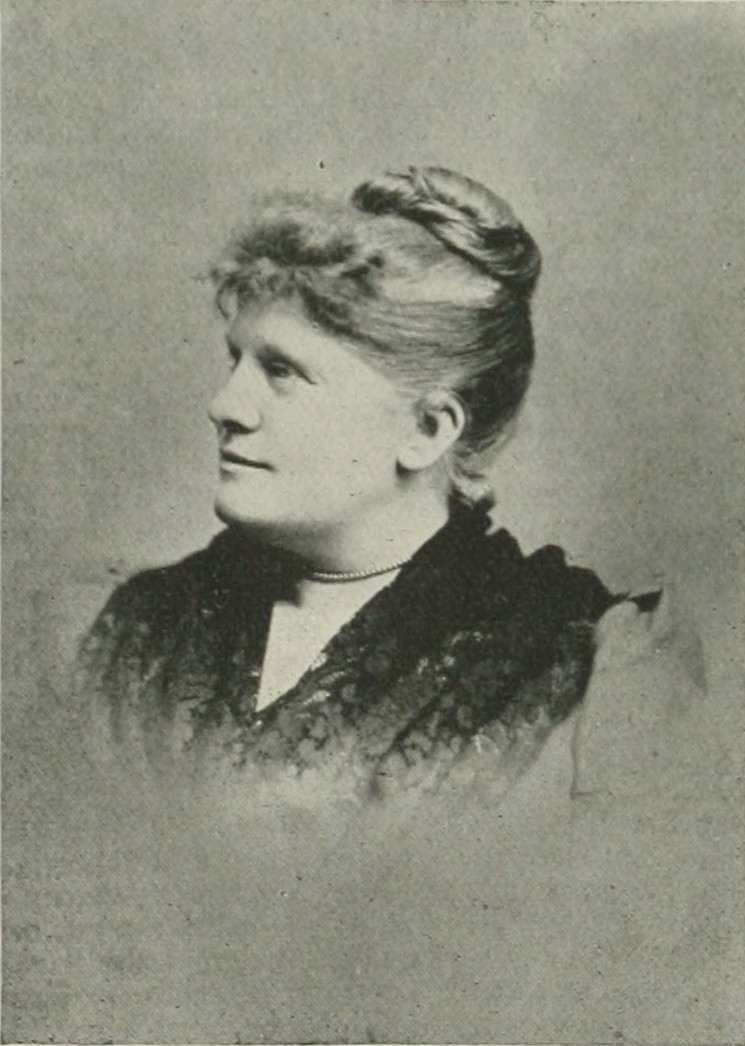
- "A Woman of the Century"
- Born: Alma Carrie Day; March 21, 1857; Columbia, New Hampshire, US
- Died: January 31, 1926 (aged 68); Colebrook, New Hampshire, US
- Occupation: journalist

Alma Carrie Cummings (née Day; 1857–1926) was an American journalist and editor and proprietor of the Colebrook, New Hampshire, News and Sentinel.

== Early life ==
Her father, Abner L. Day, was a farmer in moderate circumstances and she had only the advantages in childhood of a common-school education. She married Edwin S. Cummings on January 27, 1875, with whom she had two children.

== Career ==
When Alma Carrie married her husband, he was at the time a compositor in the office of the Northern Sentinel. A little later, the paper was consolidated with the Colebrook Weekly News, the result being the News and Sentinel. Mr. Cummings in 1885 purchased the plant, and until his death two years later, Mrs. Cummings went daily to the office and aided her husband in advancing the prosperity of the new paper. His sudden death left the business in what Cummings aptly termed the "usual unsettled condition of a country newspaper office".

Instead of selling it, Cummings was determined to hold and improve the newspaper at a sacrifice, and she succeeded far beyond her expectations. As both the editor and proprietor, she enlarged the circulation of the paper, increased the volume of news, secured more advertising, and in short made the News and Sentinel a valuable paper for northern New Hampshire.
