= Mary R. P. Hatch =

American poet

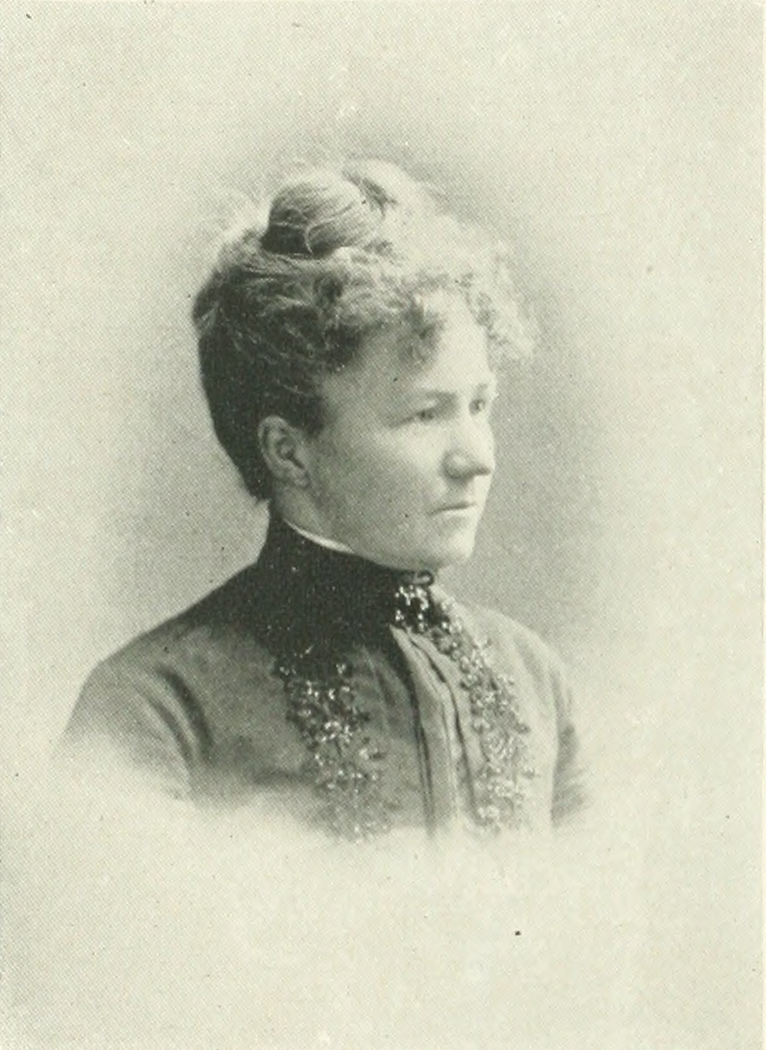
- Photo in A Woman of the Century
- Born: Mary Roxanna Platt; June 19, 1848; Stratford, New Hampshire, U.S.
- Died: November 28, 1935 (aged 87); Santa Monica, California, U.S.
- Occupation: Author
- Spouse: Antipas Morton Hatch
- Writing career
- Pen name: Mabel Percy

Mary R. P. Hatch (née, Platt; pen name Mabel Percy; June 19, 1848 – November 28, 1935) was an American author from New Hampshire. She contributed stories to the Transcript, Mountaineer, Fireside Companion, Chicago Ledger, Frank Leslie's Illustrated Newspaper, Springfield Republican, Granite Monthly, The Writer, and several magazines including the Portland Transcript, The Saturday Evening Post, Peterson's Magazine, as well as other periodicals. Her novels included The Strange Disappearance of Eugene Comstocks, The Bank Tragedy: A Novel, and The Missing Man, among others.

== Early life and education ==
Mary Roxanna Platt was born June 19, 1848, in Stratford, New Hampshire. She was the daughter of Charles G. and Mary (Blake) Platt. Her life as a farmer's daughter, and later as a farmer's wife, was spent on farms in the Connecticut River valley. As a child, she was quiet and sensitive, with scholarly tastes, writing little stories and poems before she was 12 years old. She attended the common district school until about 15 years of age, and at that time entered into advanced classes at the Lancaster academy, where she took high rank in mathematics, French, and rhetoric. Her ability as a writer was first recognized here. The weekly compositions, her contributions to the lyceum papers, and an occasional article in the county papers were favorably commented upon, and her pen name of "Mabel Percy" was soon known to the readers of the Portland Transcript, Saturday Evening Post, Peterson's Magazine, and other periodicals.

== Career ==
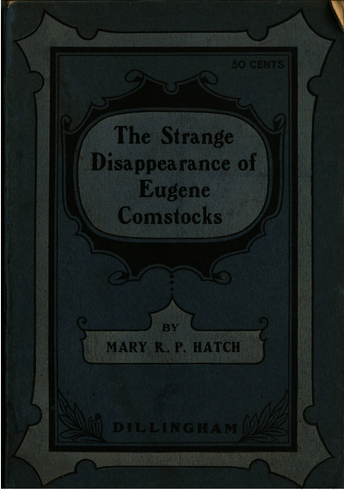
The Strange Disappearance of Eugene Comstocks

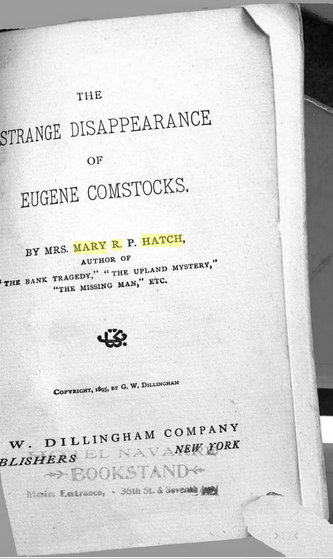
The Strange Disappearance of Eugene Comstocks

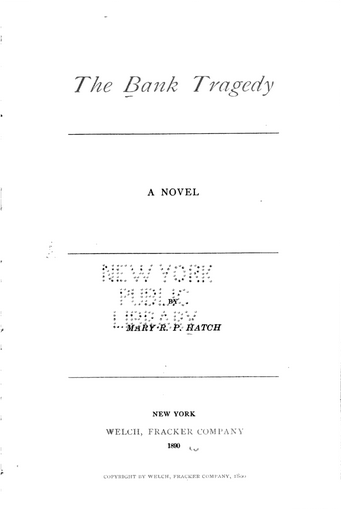
The Bank Tragedy

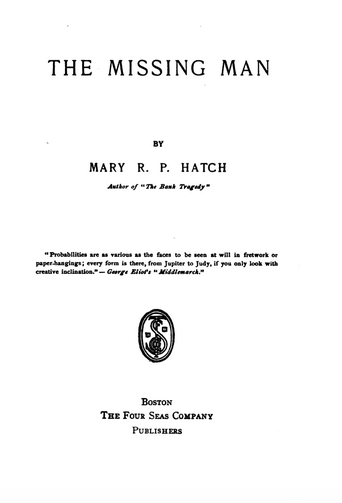
The Missing Man

After completing her education, she married Antipas Morton Hatch, and became the mother of two sons. Being a farmer's wife, and living on a large farm, her writings were her recreation, and she was accustomed to writing during intervals of domestic life.

Hatch's versatility afforded her to work in various areas of literature; for instance, at the same time that she was engaged in writing The Bank Tragedy, a biographical sketch for The Writer, she also wrote a series of dialect papers. She contributed several excellent poems, which were widely copied, among them an "Ode to J. G. Blaine". She contributed stories for the Transcript, Mountaineer, Fireside Companion, Chicago Ledger, Frank Leslie's Illustrated Newspaper, Springfield Republican, Granite Monthly, The Writer, and several magazines.

Among her most noteworthy stories are her "Upland Mystery" and "The Bank Tragedy", both of which appeared in the Transcript, with favorable comments from the US press. "Upland Mystery" was afterwards put in book form, and received a large sale. Poems, with a biographical note, were included in New Hampshire Poets, published in 1883. Hatch served as Literary Contributor to Willard and Livermore's American Women: Fifteen Hundred Biographies with Over 1,400 Portraits: A Comprehensive Encyclopedia of the Lives and Achievements of American Women During the Nineteenth Century (1897).

Though sensational in form, Hatch's books claimed to have a purpose. The Upland Mystery taught that when a person becomes a murderer he arrays the whole world against him. In Quicksands, the keynote is ambition and other "sins which do so easily beset". In The Bank Tragedy, it is inherited sin.

She died in Santa Monica, California, November 28, 1935.

== Selected works ==
- The Upland mystery : a tragedy of New England (1887) (text)
- The bank tragedy : a novel (1891) (text)
- The missing man (1893) (text)
- The strange disappearance of Eugene Comstocks (1895) (text)
- The Berkeley Street mystery (1928)

=== Dime novels ===
- The Apple Bee
- A Christmas Backlog
- The Deacon's Daughter
- A Family Name
- The Great Hampton Bank Robbery (1902)
- Miss Betsey's Family Annals
- The Old Well's Secret
- One by One
- Put One Side
- Saint John
- Sybil Heatherton
- The Two Hands
- The Wallingford Case

=== Short stories ===
- Dartmouth and the Webster centennial (1901) (text)

=== Non-fiction ===
- The gossiping guide to Dartmouth and to Hanover (1905)
- St. Johnsbury, Vermont, and its industries (1906)
- Lancaster, New Hampshire (1906) (text)

=== Children's books ===
- Merry Christmas : all pictures (1881)

=== Plays ===
- The dreamer : a romantic drama in three acts (1913)
- Mademoiselle Vivine. A vaudeville sketch (1927)
- Mrs. Bright's visitor. A comedy in one act. (1928)
