= Cedar Pond (New Hampshire) =

Lake in Coos County, United States

- Location within New Hampshire Location within the United States
- Location: Milan, New Hampshire
- Coordinates: 44°35′31″N 071°16′10″W
- Primary inflows: Cedar Brook
- Primary outflows: tributary of North Branch Upper Ammonoosuc River
- Basin countries: United States
- Max. length: 0.6 mi (0.97 km)
- Max. width: 0.2 mi (0.32 km)
- Surface area: 80 acres (32 ha)
- Average depth: 31 ft (9.4 m)
- Max. depth: 56 ft (17 m)
- Surface elevation: 1,114 ft (340 m)
- Settlements: Milan

Cedar Pond is an 80-acre (32 ha) lake in Coos County, northern New Hampshire, United States, in the town of Milan. The lake is located just south of Route 110A and west of Route 110B.

On the north side of the lake is a camping area called Cedar Pond Campground.

The lake is classified as a coldwater fishery, with observed species including rainbow trout, largemouth bass, smallmouth bass, chain pickerel, and horned pout.

== See also ==
- List of lakes in New Hampshire
