= New Hampshire Route 110 =

State highway in Coos County, New Hampshire, US

New Hampshire Route 110
- Map of Coos County in northern New Hampshire with NH 110 highlighted in red

Route information
- Maintained by NHDOT
- Length: 24.856 mi (40.002 km)

Major junctions
- West end: US 3 in Northumberland
- East end: NH 16 in Berlin

Location
- Country: United States
- State: New Hampshire
- Counties: Coos

Highway system
- New Hampshire Highway System; Interstate; US; State; Turnpikes
← NH 109A	→ NH 111

New Hampshire Route 110 (abbreviated NH 110) is a 24.856-mile-long (40.002 km) east–west state highway in Coos County, northern New Hampshire, United States. The road winds through the scenic, mountainous country of New Hampshire north of the White Mountain National Forest. NH 110 is locally named the Berlin-Groveton Highway.

The eastern terminus of NH 110 is in Berlin at New Hampshire Route 16 (White Mountain Road). The western terminus of NH 110 is at U.S. Route 3 in the village of Groveton, town of Northumberland, on the Connecticut River.

== Major intersections ==
The entire route is in Coos County.

Location	mi	km	Destinations	Notes
Northumberland	0.000	0.000	US 3 (Daniel Webster Highway) – Lancaster, Colebrook	
Milan	13.753	22.133	NH 110A (Muzzey Hill Road)	Western terminus of NH 110A
Berlin	24.856	40.002	NH 16 – Gorham	
1.000 mi = 1.609 km; 1.000 km = 0.621 mi

== Suffixed routes ==
=== New Hampshire Route 110A ===
New Hampshire Route 110A
- Location: Milan–Dummer
- Length: 3.897 mi (6.272 km)

New Hampshire Route 110A (abbreviated NH 110A) is a 3.897-mile-long (6.272 km) connector road in the town of Milan, north of Berlin, United States. NH 110A is locally named Cedar Pond Road.

The eastern terminus of NH 110A is at New Hampshire Route 16 (White Mountain Road) 12 miles (19.3 km) north of Berlin. The western terminus is at New Hampshire Route 110 11.2 miles (18 km) northwest of Berlin.

=== New Hampshire Route 110B ===
New Hampshire Route 110B
- Location: Milan
- Length: 4.626 mi (7.445 km)

New Hampshire Route 110B (abbreviated NH 110B) is a 4.626-mile-long (7.445 km) connector road in the town of Milan, New Hampshire, north of Berlin. NH 110B is locally named Milan Hill Road.

The eastern terminus of NH 110B is at New Hampshire Route 16 near the Berlin Regional Airport. The western terminus is at New Hampshire Route 110A near Cedar Pond.
