= Janice Peaslee Bridge =

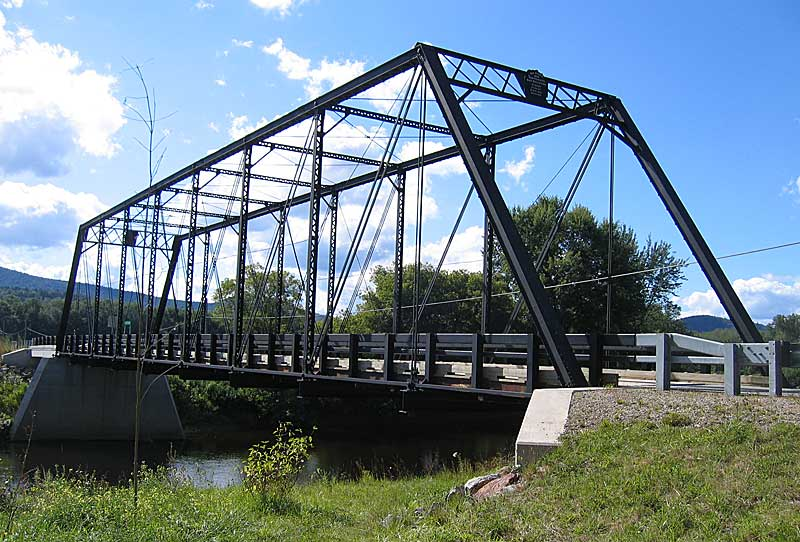
- Coordinates: 44°39′6.69″N 71°33′45″W
- Carries: Pedestrian and vehicular traffic
- Crosses: Connecticut River
- Locale: Stratford, New Hampshire to Maidstone, Vermont

Characteristics
- Design: Pin-connected steel & wrought iron Pratt through truss bridge
- Load limit: 20 tons

History
- Opened: 1893, 2005
- Closed: 1990

Location
- Interactive map of Janice Peaslee Bridge

The Janice Peaslee Bridge (formerly known as the Maidstone-Stratford Hollow Bridge) is a pin-connected steel & wrought iron Pratt through truss bridge crossing the Connecticut River between Stratford, New Hampshire and Maidstone, Vermont.

== History and construction ==
The bridge was originally completed in 1893 by the Berlin Iron Bridge Company, East Berlin, Connecticut. It was closed "temporarily" in 1990 for safety reasons. Due to the perseverance of Vermont State Representative Janice L. Peaslee, it underwent a total rebuild which was completed in 2005.

In order to facilitate reconstruction of the abutments, the bridge was placed on land for repairs while the foundations were rebuilt and a new approach was created.

Since the bridge was resurrected as a result of Janice Peaslee's efforts, the bridge was renamed in her honor in 2006.

The bridge was closed starting July 5, 2023 due to unspecified damage. However, it reopened in early 2024 and is currently operational.

== Image gallery ==
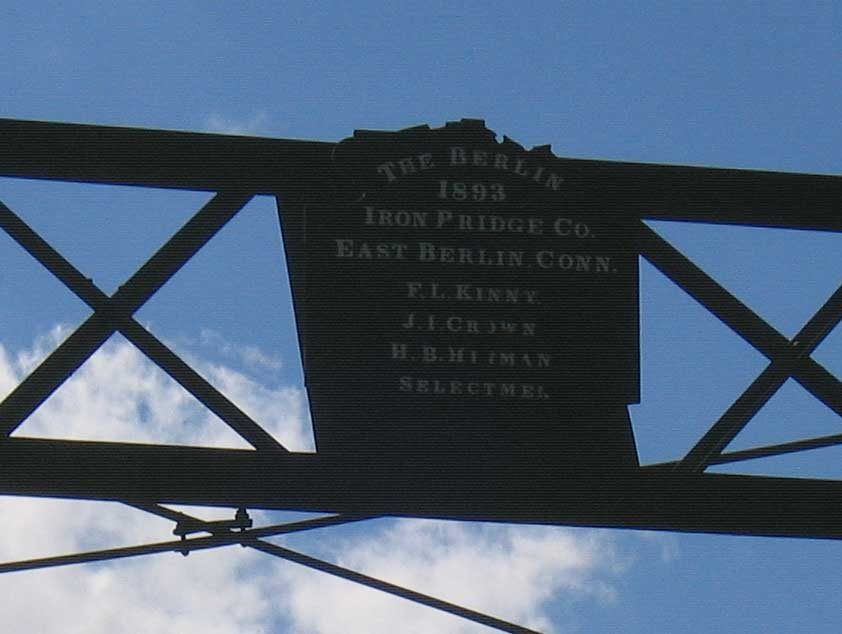
Original maker's mark circa 1893

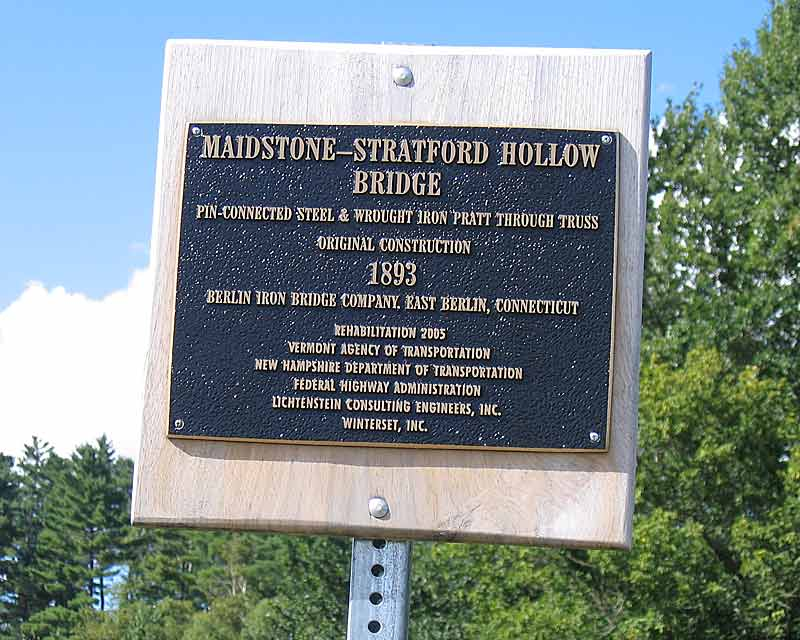
New maker's mark circa 2005

== See also ==
- List of crossings of the Connecticut River
