= Wallace Farm (Columbia, New Hampshire) =

- U.S. National Register of Historic Places
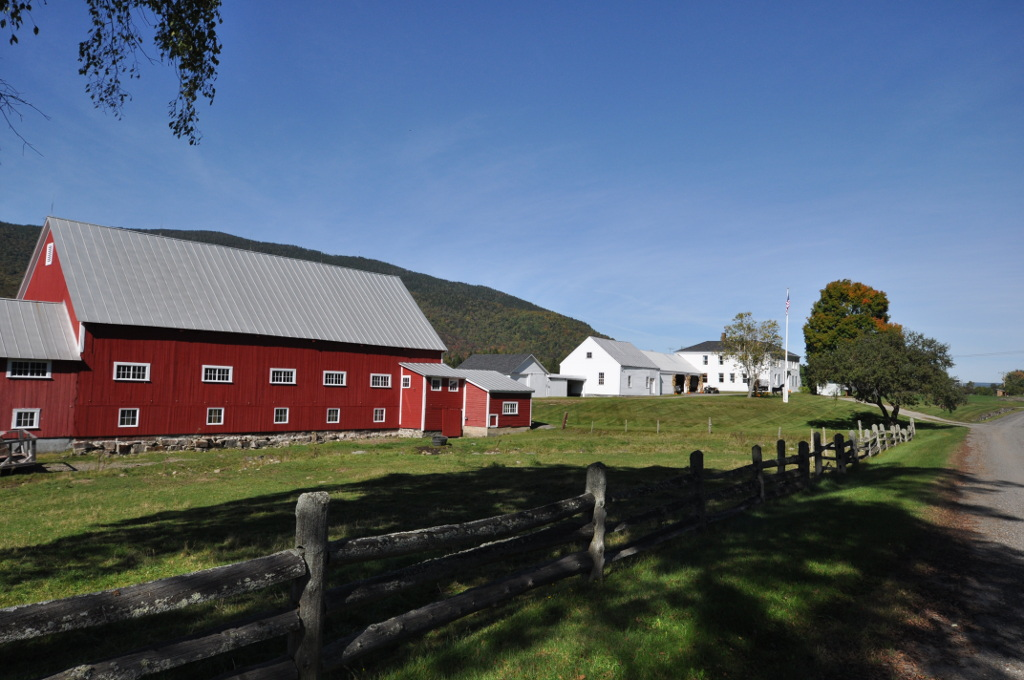

- Location within New Hampshire Location within the United States
- Location: 27 Wallace Rd., Columbia, New Hampshire
- Coordinates: 44°51′59″N 71°31′41″W
- Area: 125 acres (51 ha)
- Built: 1825
- Architectural style: Federal
- NRHP reference No.: 01001353
- Added to NRHP: December 13, 2001

The Wallace Farm (also known as Pioneer Farm) is a historic farm at 27 Wallace Road in Columbia, New Hampshire. Established in the late 18th century, the farm has (as of 2001) been continuously held in the same family. The 125-acre (51 ha) includes a c. 1825 farmhouse, carriage house, and barn. It was listed on the National Register of Historic Places in 2001.

== Description and history ==
Wallace Farm is located in northern Columbia, a rural community on the east bank of the Connecticut River. The farm property extends eastward from the river, straddling United States Route 3. The area west of the highway is in agriculture, pasture, and woodland, while the area to its east is primarily wooded, including a large sugar bush. The farmstead is located along an old alignment of US 3, between the current highway and the river. The farmstead consists of a series of connected buildings, the oldest of which is the c. 1825 main house, and a separate dairy barn. The house is a 2 1/2 story timber frame structure, that has an L shape, and exhibits Greek Revival styling. The interior was extensively restyled in the 1850s or 1860s. Attached to the main block is a series of three buildings: a carriage house and horse barn, each dating to the time of the house, and an early 20th-century garage. The farm has been in Wallace family hands since the late 18th century.

Three brothers of the Wallace family were among Columbia's first settlers, arriving in 1785. Only William, the youngest of the three, remained to work the land they cleared, and he soon became one of the area's most successful farmers. At first a diversified agricultural operation, the farm became focused on dairying as its primary activity in the late 19th century, continuing until 1986, when the herd was sold off. The surviving farmstead is one of the community's best surviving examples of a connected 19th-century farmstead.

== See also ==
- National Register of Historic Places listings in Coos County, New Hampshire
