= Maidstone State Park =

State park in Essex County, Vermont

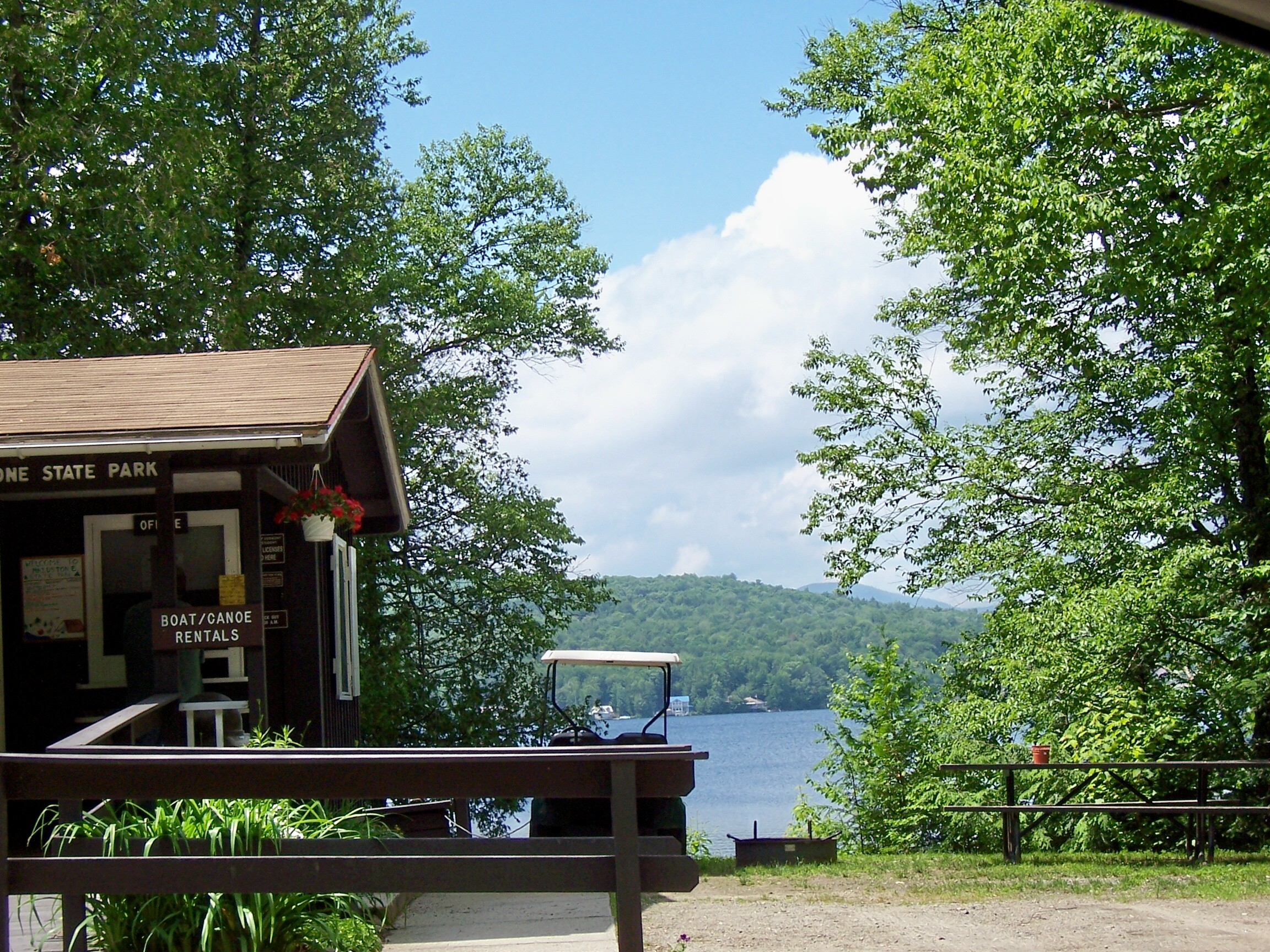

- Location within Vermont
- Interactive map of Maidstone State Park
- Location: Brunswick and Maidstone, Vermont, United States
- Coordinates: 44°38′19″N 71°38′36″W
- Area: 475 acres (192 ha)
- Established: 1938
- Administrator: Vermont Department of Forests, Parks, and Recreation
- Website: Official website
- Vermont State Parks
- Maidstone State Park
- U.S. National Register of Historic Places
- U.S. Historic district
- Location: 4858 and 4876 Maidstone Rd., Maidstone, Vermont, United States
- Area: 640 acres (260 ha)
- Built: 1938
- Built by: CCC; Dept. of the Interior
- Architectural style: CCC State Park
- MPS: Historic Park Landscapes in National and State Parks MPS
- NRHP reference No.: 01001285
- Added to NRHP: November 29, 2001

Maidstone State Park is a state park in the U.S. state of Vermont. The park is located in the town of Maidstone in Essex County in Vermont's Northeast Kingdom. One of the state's most remote parks, it provides public access to the 796-acre (322 ha) glacial Maidstone Lake in Maidstone State Forest. The park was developed by the Civilian Conservation Corps and opened in 1938. Activities include fishing, hiking, camping, boating, wildlife watching, and picnicking.

== Features ==
Maidstone State Park is located in rural western Maidstone, on the south and east sides of Maidstone Lake. The park consists of two separate areas, one for day use, and other for camping and hiking, accessed by Maidstone Lake Road. The day use area, about 40 acres (16 ha) in size, includes a beach, picnic area with large CCC-built pavilion, and a nature center also built by the CCC. The picnic area includes fourteen stone fireplaces built by the CCC. About one mile south of the day use area is the larger 600-acre (240 ha) parcel, which includes two camping loops and extends into the hills south of the lake. Camping facilities include 34 tent/RV sites and 37 lean-tos, rest rooms with hot showers, and a sanitary dump station. Some of the leantos were built by the CCC.

== History ==
The park was developed in 1938, and was one of the last of the Vermont state parks to be built by the Civilian Conservation Corps, a Depression-era jobs program. The features developed by the park illustrate the rise of the automobile for vacation travel: not only is the park so remote that a car is needed to access it, but the CCC also built a parking lot at the day use area. The park underwent a major upgrade to its infrastructure in the late 1970s, but has retained the basic feel of its early appearance.

== See also ==
- National Register of Historic Places listings in Essex County, Vermont
