= Tinkerville, New Hampshire =

Unincorporated community in New Hampshire, United States

- Unincorporated community
- Location within New Hampshire Location within the United States
- Coordinates: 44°46′50″N 71°35′00″W
- Country: United States
- State: New Hampshire
- County: Coös
- Town: Columbia
- Elevation: 1,011 ft (308 m)
- Time zone: UTC-5 (Eastern)
  - Summer (DST): UTC-4 (Eastern)
- GNIS feature ID: 870445

Tinkerville is an unincorporated community in the town of Columbia in Coös County, New Hampshire, United States. It is located 26 miles (42 km) north of Lancaster and 10 miles (16 km) south of Colebrook along U.S. Route 3 near the Connecticut River. It has an elevation of 1,014 feet (309 m).
