= Columbia, New Hampshire =

- Town
- Columbia, New Hampshire, from the north

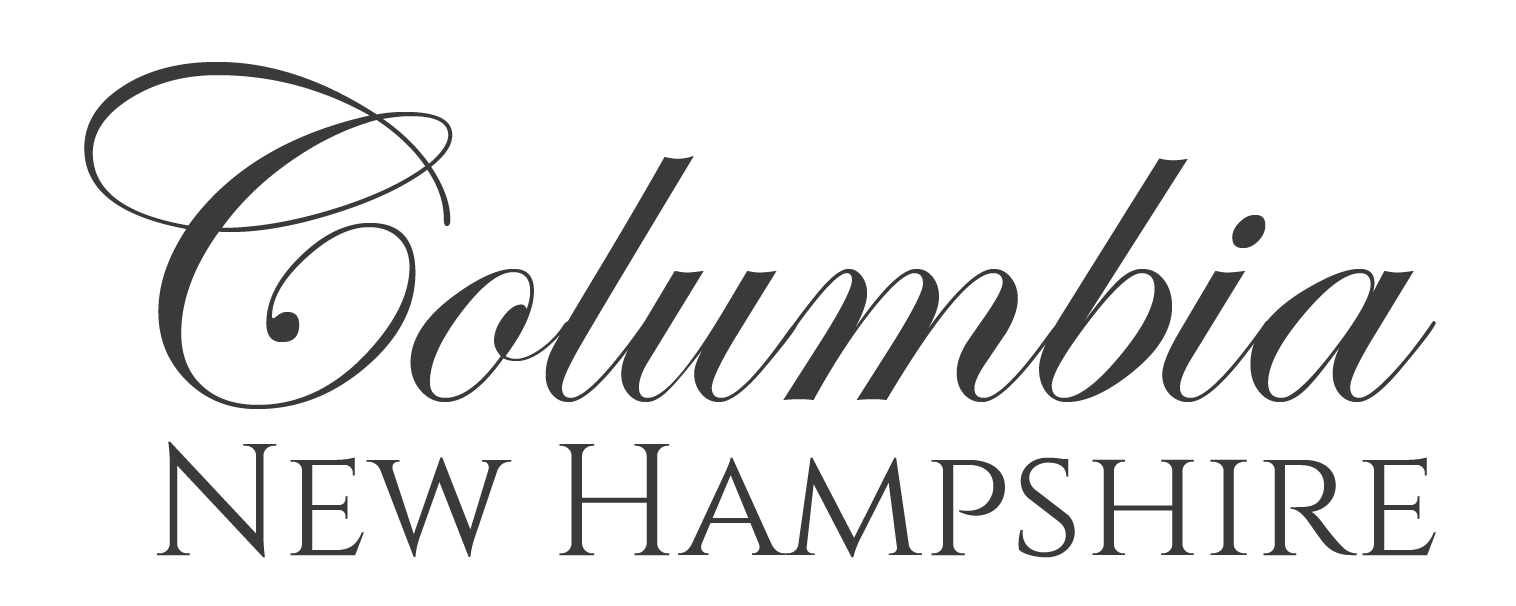
- Logo

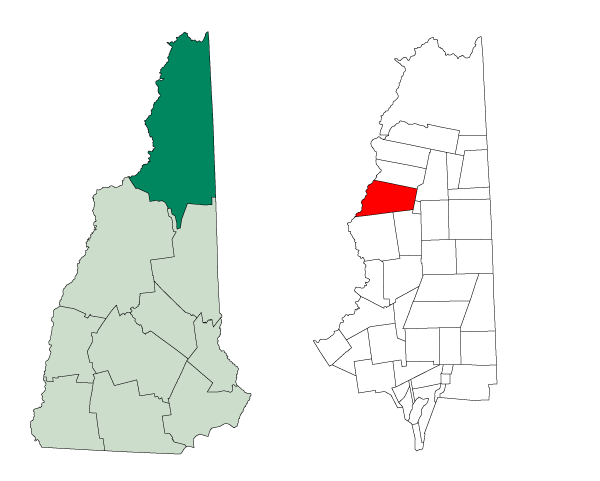
- Location in Coös County, New Hampshire
- Coordinates: 44°51′40″N 71°30′51″W
- Country: United States
- State: New Hampshire
- County: Coös
- Incorporated: 1797
- Villages: Columbia; Tinkerville

Area
  - Total: 61.1 sq mi (158.3 km^{2})
  - Land: 60.8 sq mi (157.4 km^{2})
  - Water: 0.35 sq mi (0.9 km^{2}) 0.55%
- Elevation: 1,782 ft (543 m)

Population (2020)
  - Total: 659
  - Density: 11/sq mi (4.2/km^{2})
- Time zone: UTC-5 (Eastern)
  - Summer (DST): UTC-4 (Eastern)
- ZIP codes: 03576 (Colebrook); 03590 (North Stratford)
- Area code: 603
- FIPS code: 33-13940
- GNIS feature ID: 873568
- Website: www.columbianh.org

Columbia is a town in Coös County, New Hampshire, United States. The population was 659 at the 2020 census, down from 757 at the 2010 census, and was estimated to be 673 in 2025. It is part of the Berlin, NH-VT micropolitan statistical area.

== History ==
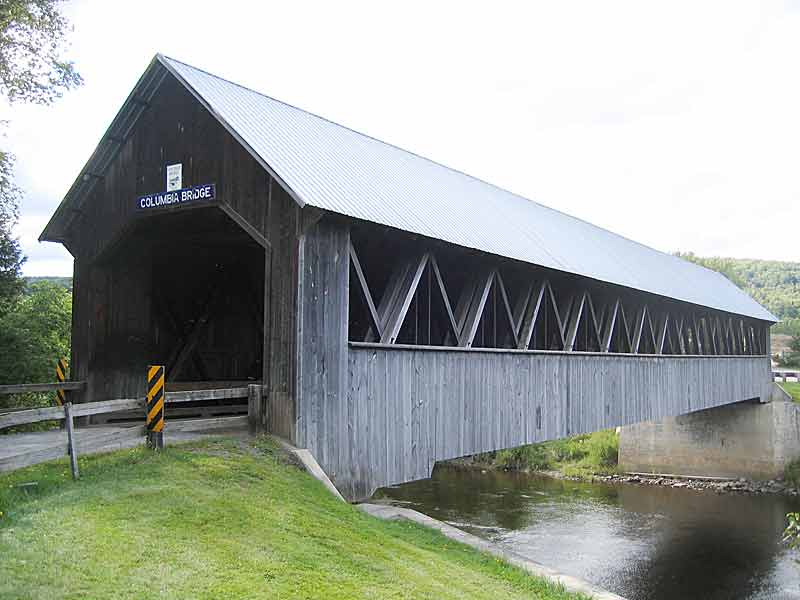
Columbia Covered Bridge, built in 1912

The township was originally chartered in 1762 and named "Preston", after Richard Graham, 1st Viscount Preston of Scotland. Settlers failed to meet the terms of the original grant, so the plantation was transferred in 1770 to grantees including Sir James Cockburn, 8th Baronet, after which it was named "Cockburn Town", incorporated on December 16, 1797. In 1811, in the lead-up to the War of 1812, Governor John Langdon changed the name to Columbia.

Although the terrain is mountainous, the soil was of good quality. Maple sugar became an important product, and lumber was cut and transported on rafts down the Connecticut River to markets. By 1859, when the population was 762, Columbia had four sawmills, three gristmills, two clapboard machines, and a starch mill.

== Geography ==
According to the United States Census Bureau, the town has a total area of 61.1 square miles (158.3 km^{2}), of which 60.8 square miles (157.4 km^{2}) are land and 0.3 square miles (0.9 km^{2}) are water, comprising 0.55% of the town. It is drained by the east and west branches of Simms Stream. The highest point is the summit of Blue Mountain, at 3,720 feet (1,130 m) above sea level. Columbia lies fully within the Connecticut River watershed.

The town is served by U.S. Route 3.

=== Climate ===
Blue Mountain, the highest point in the town, has a humid continental climate (Köppen Dfb), bordering on a subarctic climate (Köppen Dfc). There is no weather station at the summit, but this climate table contains interpolated data for an area around the summit.

Climate data for Blue Mountain (NH) 44.7955 N, 71.4768 W, Elevation: 3,445 ft (1,050 m) (1991–2020 normals)
Month	Jan	Feb	Mar	Apr	May	Jun	Jul	Aug	Sep	Oct	Nov	Dec	Year
Mean daily maximum °F (°C)	20.0 (−6.7)	23.8 (−4.6)	28.9 (−1.7)	44.1 (6.7)	57.2 (14.0)	65.8 (18.8)	70.3 (21.3)	69.1 (20.6)	62.7 (17.1)	49.6 (9.8)	35.7 (2.1)	25.6 (−3.6)	46.1 (7.8)
Daily mean °F (°C)	11.8 (−11.2)	14.3 (−9.8)	20.2 (−6.6)	34.1 (1.2)	46.0 (7.8)	55.0 (12.8)	59.5 (15.3)	58.2 (14.6)	51.8 (11.0)	40.3 (4.6)	28.4 (−2.0)	17.8 (−7.9)	36.5 (2.5)
Mean daily minimum °F (°C)	3.6 (−15.8)	4.9 (−15.1)	11.5 (−11.4)	24.2 (−4.3)	34.9 (1.6)	44.1 (6.7)	48.7 (9.3)	47.3 (8.5)	40.9 (4.9)	30.9 (−0.6)	21.0 (−6.1)	10.0 (−12.2)	26.8 (−2.9)
Average precipitation inches (mm)	4.64 (118)	3.84 (98)	4.47 (114)	4.47 (114)	5.19 (132)	5.89 (150)	5.48 (139)	6.36 (162)	4.73 (120)	5.75 (146)	4.80 (122)	4.95 (126)	60.57 (1,541)
Source: PRISM Climate Group

== Demographics ==
Historical population
Census	Pop.	Note	%±
1790	26		—
1800	109		319.2%
1810	142		30.3%
1820	249		75.4%
1830	442		77.5%
1840	620		40.3%
1850	762		22.9%
1860	798		4.7%
1870	752		−5.8%
1880	762		1.3%
1890	605		−20.6%
1900	690		14.0%
1910	619		−10.3%
1920	601		−2.9%
1930	524		−12.8%
1940	483		−7.8%
1950	495		2.5%
1960	457		−7.7%
1970	467		2.2%
1980	673		44.1%
1990	661		−1.8%
2000	750		13.5%
2010	757		0.9%
2020	659		−12.9%
U.S. Decennial Census

At the 2000 census there were 750 people, 300 households, and 218 families living in the town. The population density was 12.3 people per square mile (4.8/km^{2}). There were 449 housing units at an average density of 7.4 per square mile (2.8/km^{2}). The racial makeup of the town was 97.60% White, 0.13% African American, 0.27% Native American, 0.27% Asian, and 1.73% from two or more races. Hispanic or Latino of any race were 0.67%.

Of the 300 households 31.7% had children under the age of 18 living with them, 60.0% were married couples living together, 7.7% had a female householder with no husband present, and 27.3% were non-families. 21.3% of households were one person and 8.0% were one person aged 65 or older. The average household size was 2.49 and the average family size was 2.82.

The age distribution was 24.8% under the age of 18, 4.4% from 18 to 24, 26.5% from 25 to 44, 29.1% from 45 to 64, and 15.2% 65 or older. The median age was 42 years. For every 100 females, there were 113.7 males. For every 100 females age 18 and over, there were 101.4 males.

The median household income was $36,964 and the median family income was $42,143. Males had a median income of $27,604 versus $19,732 for females. The per capita income for the town was $16,859. About 4.0% of families and 7.3% of the population were below the poverty line, including 6.8% of those under age 18 and 10.1% of those age 65 or over.

== Adjacent municipalities ==
- Colebrook (north)
- Dixville (northeast)
- Erving's Location (southeast)
- Odell (southeast)
- Stratford (south)
- Bloomfield, Vermont (southwest)
- Lemington, Vermont (northwest)

== Notable people ==
- Alma Carrie Cummings (1857–1926), American journalist; newspaper editor and proprietor
- Eric Stohl, former state representative

== See also ==
- Wallace Farm
