= Wausau Paper =

American pulp and paper company

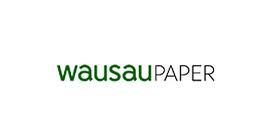
- Type: Public
- Traded as: (NYSE: WPP) before Jan 21, 2016
- Industry: Pulp and paper
- Founded: 1899
- Headquarters: Mosinee, Wisconsin, U.S.
- Area served: North America
- Key people: Michael Burandt (Chairman and CEO)
- Revenue: ▲US$352.0 million (2014)
- Operating income: ▼US$(2,762) million (2014)
- Net income: ▲US$(17,534) million (2014)
- Total assets: ▼US$463.9 million (2014)
- Total equity: ▼US$127.5 million (2014)
- Number of employees: 870 (2014)
- Website: www.wausaupaper.com

Wausau Paper (NYSE: WPP) (stylized as wausauPAPER) is an American pulp and paper company. It has approximately 870 employees as of December 2014, has manufacturing operations in Harrodsburg, Kentucky and Middletown, Ohio, and a support services facility in Mosinee, Wisconsin. On January 21, 2016, Wausau Paper was acquired by SCA Tissue North America for $513 million. The stock was removed from NYSE on the same day.

Wausau Paper Corp. (Wausau Paper) incorporated on June 9, 1899, and manufactures, converts, and sells paper and paper products. As of May 9, 2014, the company had two operating facilities and a services center located in three states. The company operates a single principal business in the away-from-home towel and tissue segment of the paper industry. The company produces a line of towel and tissue products that are marketed, along with soap and dispensing systems, for the away-from-home market.
