= Stratford, New Hampshire =

- Town
- North Stratford, New Hampshire, from the northwest

- Seal

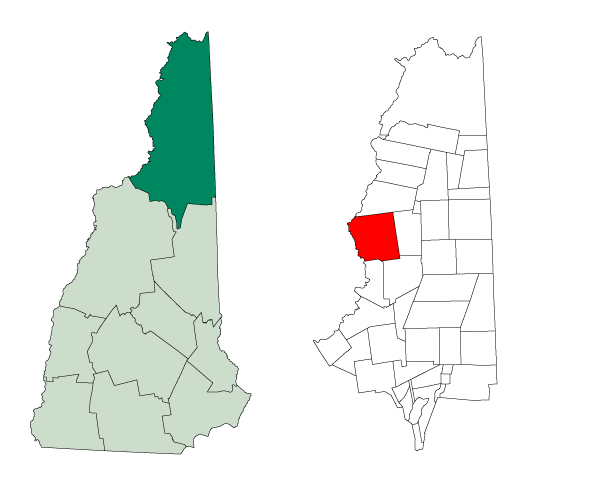
- Location in Coös County, New Hampshire
- Coordinates: 44°44′02″N 71°33′11″W
- Country: United States
- State: New Hampshire
- County: Coös
- Incorporated: 1773
- Villages: Beatties; North Stratford; Stratford Hollow

Area
  - Total: 79.8 sq mi (206.6 km^{2})
  - Land: 79.2 sq mi (205.2 km^{2})
  - Water: 0.54 sq mi (1.4 km^{2}) 0.66%
- Elevation: 2,008 ft (612 m)

Population (2020)
  - Total: 662
  - Density: 8.3/sq mi (3.2/km^{2})
- Time zone: UTC-5 (Eastern)
  - Summer (DST): UTC-4 (Eastern)
- ZIP code: 03590
- Area code: 603
- 33-74180: FIPS code
- 873727: GNIS feature ID
- Website: www.stratfordnh.gov

Stratford is a town located on the Connecticut River in Coös County, New Hampshire, United States. The population was 662 at the 2020 census, a decline from the figure of 746 tabulated in 2010. Within the town are the villages of North Stratford, Stratford Hollow, and Beatties. U.S. Route 3 passes through the center of town, as does the St. Lawrence and Atlantic Railroad, formerly a part of the Grand Trunk Railway.

Stratford is part of the Berlin, NH-VT Micropolitan Statistical Area.

The Janice Peaslee Bridge connects Stratford to Maidstone, Vermont.

== History ==
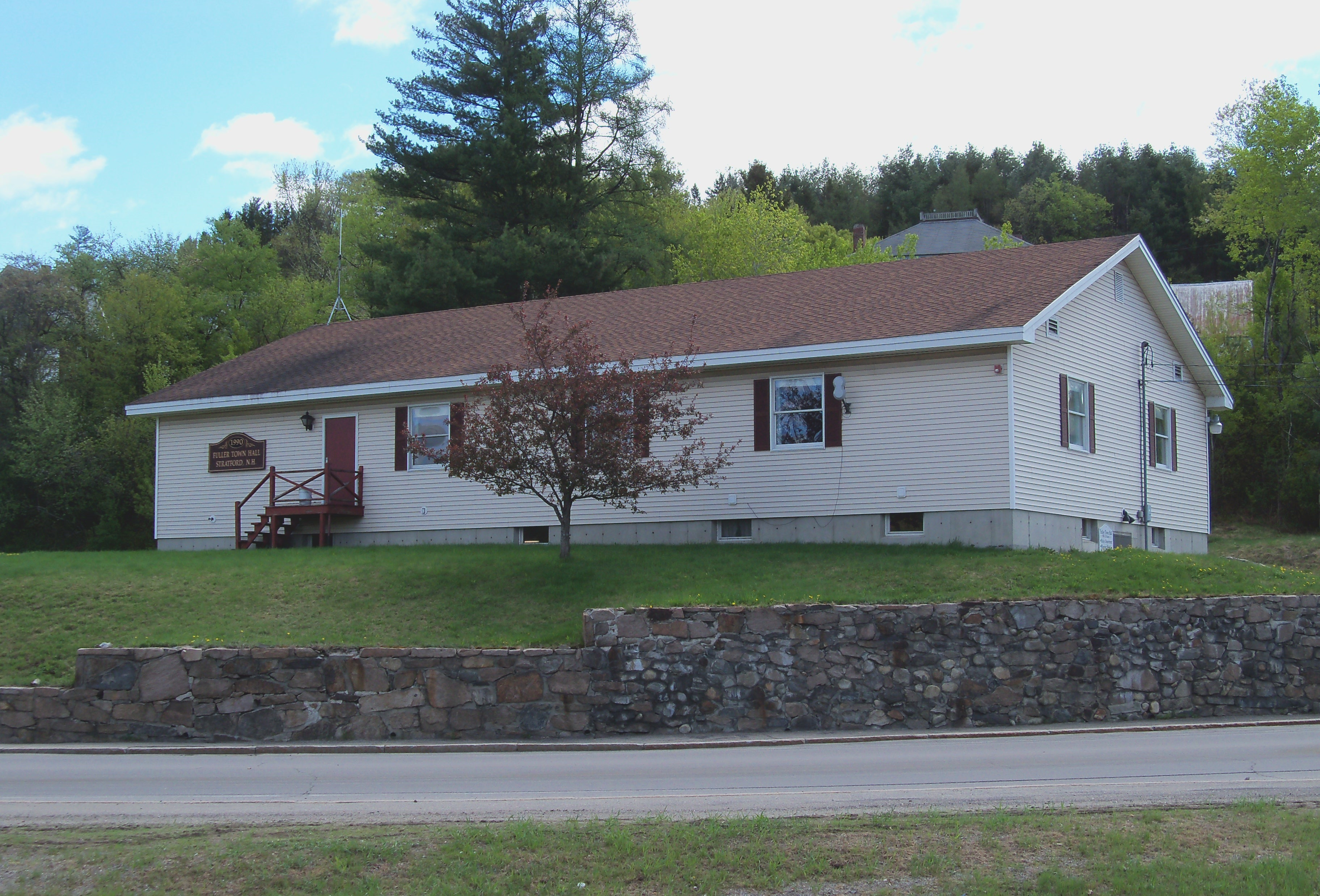
Stratford Town Hall

Originally granted in 1762 with the name "Woodbury", the town was regranted as Stratford in 1773.

== Geography ==
According to the United States Census Bureau, the town has a total area of 79.8 square miles (206.6 km^{2}), of which 79.2 square miles (205.2 km^{2}) are land and 0.5 square miles (1.4 km^{2}) are water, comprising 0.66% of the town.

The highest point in Stratford is the summit of Sugarloaf, at 3,700 feet (1,128 m) above sea level.

== Demographics ==
Historical population
Census	Pop.	Note	%±
1790	146		—
1800	281		92.5%
1810	339		20.6%
1820	335		−1.2%
1830	443		32.2%
1840	441		−0.5%
1850	552		25.2%
1860	716		29.7%
1870	886		23.7%
1880	1,016		14.7%
1890	1,128		11.0%
1900	968		−14.2%
1910	844		−12.8%
1920	794		−5.9%
1930	918		15.6%
1940	1,049		14.3%
1950	973		−7.2%
1960	1,029		5.8%
1970	980		−4.8%
1980	989		0.9%
1990	927		−6.3%
2000	942		1.6%
2010	746		−20.8%
2020	662		−11.3%
U.S. Decennial Census

At the 2000 census there were 942 people, 397 households, and 235 families living in the town. The population density was 11.8 people per square mile (4.6/km^{2}). There were 540 housing units at an average density of 6.8 per square mile (2.6/km^{2}). The racial makeup of the town was 95.75% White, 1.27% Native American, 0.11% from other races, and 2.87% from two or more races. Hispanic or Latino of any race were 0.74%.

Of the 397 households 26.7% had children under the age of 18 living with them, 42.6% were married couples living together, 12.1% had a female householder with no husband present, and 40.8% were non-families. 32.0% of households were one person and 10.8% were one person aged 65 or older. The average household size was 2.37 and the average family size was 3.03.

The age distribution was 23.8% under the age of 18, 9.0% from 18 to 24, 24.3% from 25 to 44, 30.1% from 45 to 64, and 12.7% 65 or older. The median age was 40 years. For every 100 females, there were 85.8 males. For every 100 females age 18 and over, there were 88.5 males.

The median household income was $28,594 and the median family income was $33,295. Males had a median income of $29,375 versus $21,488 for females. The per capita income for the town was $13,783. About 10.7% of families and 14.3% of the population were below the poverty line, including 18.5% of those under age 18 and 8.9% of those age 65 or over.

== Adjacent municipalities ==
- Columbia (north)
- Odell (east)
- Stark (southeast)
- Northumberland (south)
- Maidstone, Vermont (southwest)
- Brunswick, Vermont (west)
- Bloomfield, Vermont (northwest)

== Notable people ==
- Jared W. Daniels (1827–1904), American physician, Indian agent
- Mary R. Platt Hatch (1848–1935), author

== See also ==
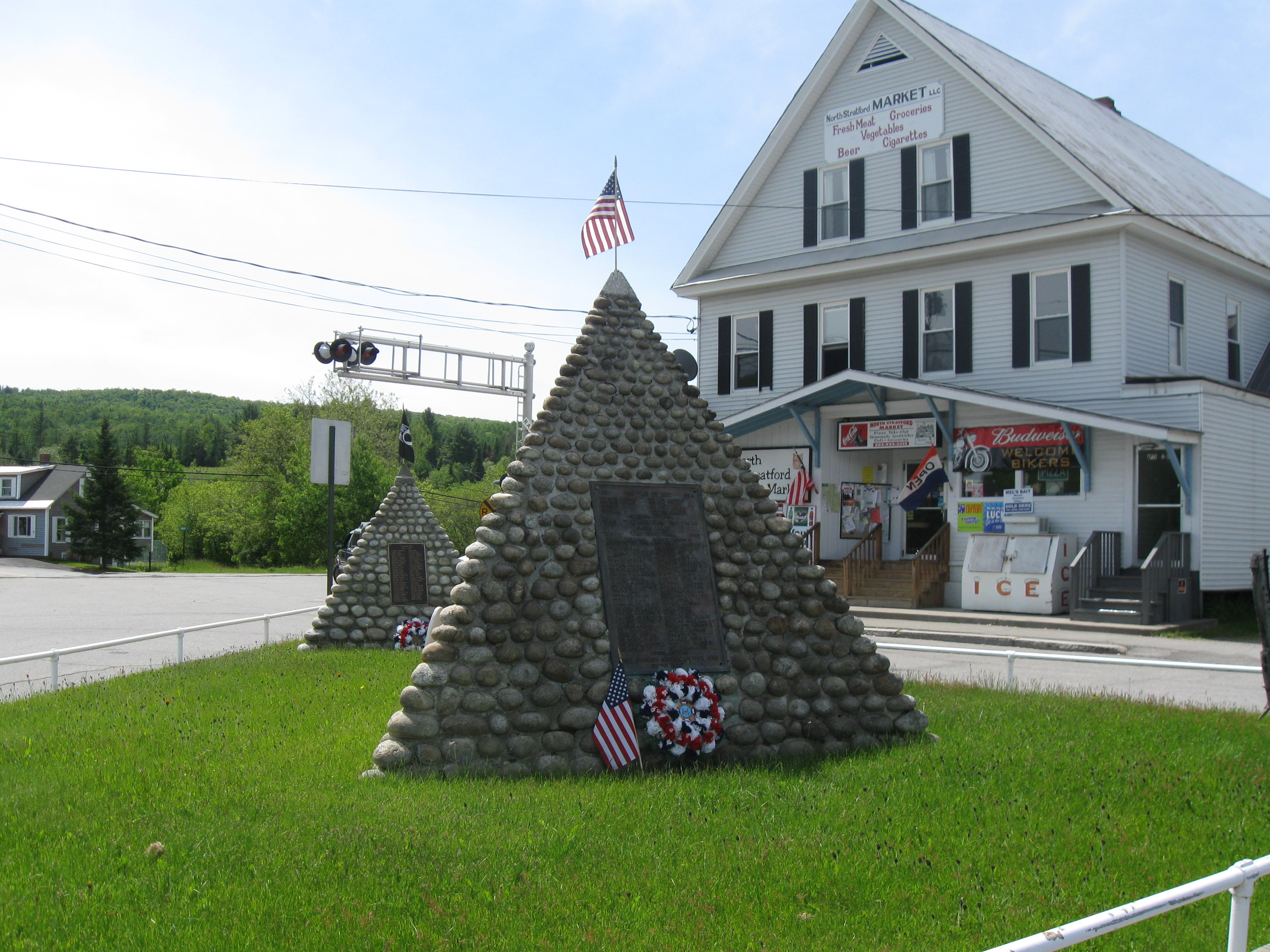
North Stratford village

- New Hampshire Historical Marker No. 34: Log Drives
