= North Stratford, New Hampshire =

Unincorporated community in New Hampshire, United States

- Unincorporated community
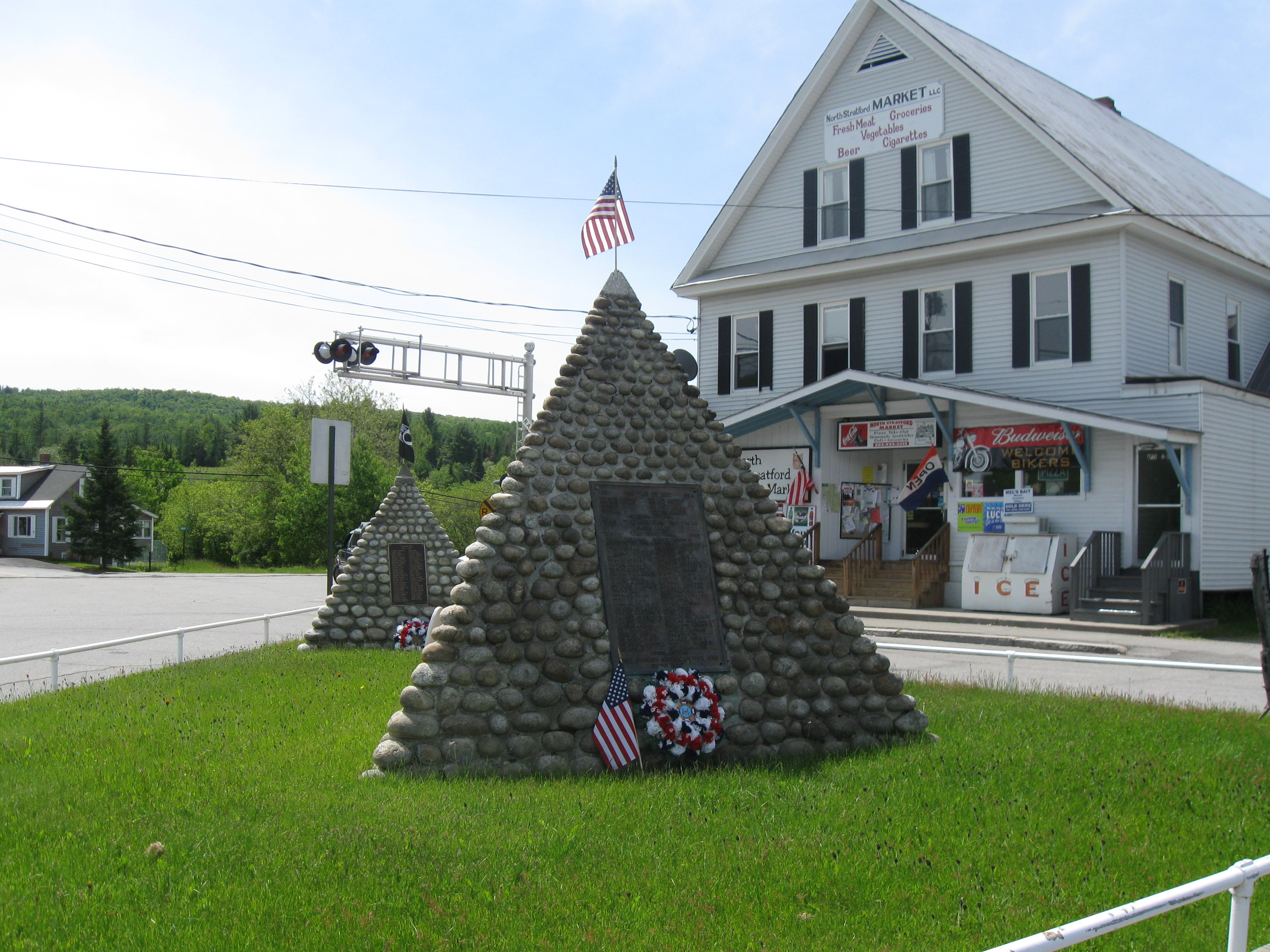
- North Stratford village

- Location within New Hampshire Location within the United States
- Coordinates: 44°45′06″N 71°37′33″W
- Country: United States
- State: New Hampshire
- County: Coos
- Town: Stratford
- Elevation: 909 ft (277 m)
- Time zone: UTC-5 (Eastern (EST))
  - Summer (DST): UTC-4 (EDT)
- ZIP code: 03590
- Area code: 603
- GNIS feature ID: 868815

North Stratford is an unincorporated community in the town of Stratford in Coos County, New Hampshire, United States. It is located in the northwestern corner of the town, along the Connecticut River and adjacent to Bloomfield, Vermont.

North Stratford is located at the junction of U.S. Route 3 and Bridge Street, which becomes Vermont Route 105 when it crosses the Connecticut River. Route 3 leads north to Colebrook and south to Groveton and Lancaster.

North Stratford has a ZIP code of 03590 and is the location of the only post office in the town of Stratford.

== Climate ==
According to the Köppen Climate Classification system, North Stratford has a warm-summer humid continental climate, abbreviated "Dfb" on climate maps. The hottest temperature recorded in North Stratford was 97 °F (36.1 °C) on June 22, 1989, while the coldest temperature recorded was −40 °F (−40.0 °C) on February 7–8, 1993, and January 2, 2018.

Climate data for North Stratford, New Hampshire, 1991–2020 normals, extremes 1968–2021
Month	Jan	Feb	Mar	Apr	May	Jun	Jul	Aug	Sep	Oct	Nov	Dec	Year
Record high °F (°C)	61 (16)	71 (22)	80 (27)	87 (31)	93 (34)	97 (36)	95 (35)	95 (35)	91 (33)	81 (27)	72 (22)	62 (17)	97 (36)
Mean maximum °F (°C)	47.0 (8.3)	49.1 (9.5)	57.9 (14.4)	75.1 (23.9)	83.5 (28.6)	88.5 (31.4)	88.8 (31.6)	87.7 (30.9)	84.4 (29.1)	75.0 (23.9)	63.4 (17.4)	49.7 (9.8)	90.8 (32.7)
Mean daily maximum °F (°C)	25.0 (−3.9)	28.1 (−2.2)	37.2 (2.9)	51.5 (10.8)	65.6 (18.7)	74.4 (23.6)	78.8 (26.0)	77.3 (25.2)	69.7 (20.9)	56.1 (13.4)	42.4 (5.8)	30.9 (−0.6)	53.1 (11.7)
Daily mean °F (°C)	13.5 (−10.3)	15.2 (−9.3)	25.6 (−3.6)	40.1 (4.5)	53.0 (11.7)	62.3 (16.8)	66.9 (19.4)	65.1 (18.4)	57.5 (14.2)	45.1 (7.3)	33.4 (0.8)	21.7 (−5.7)	41.6 (5.3)
Mean daily minimum °F (°C)	2.1 (−16.6)	2.3 (−16.5)	14.1 (−9.9)	28.7 (−1.8)	40.4 (4.7)	50.2 (10.1)	55.1 (12.8)	53.0 (11.7)	45.4 (7.4)	34.1 (1.2)	24.4 (−4.2)	12.4 (−10.9)	30.2 (−1.0)
Mean minimum °F (°C)	−22.7 (−30.4)	−21.2 (−29.6)	−13.6 (−25.3)	13.9 (−10.1)	26.3 (−3.2)	35.3 (1.8)	42.8 (6.0)	40.5 (4.7)	30.4 (−0.9)	21.5 (−5.8)	5.2 (−14.9)	−11.7 (−24.3)	−27.2 (−32.9)
Record low °F (°C)	−40 (−40)	−40 (−40)	−28 (−33)	−8 (−22)	19 (−7)	28 (−2)	33 (1)	29 (−2)	20 (−7)	10 (−12)	−13 (−25)	−30 (−34)	−40 (−40)
Average precipitation inches (mm)	2.55 (65)	2.24 (57)	2.42 (61)	3.02 (77)	3.70 (94)	4.39 (112)	4.54 (115)	3.98 (101)	3.60 (91)	4.21 (107)	2.92 (74)	3.04 (77)	40.61 (1,031)
Average snowfall inches (cm)	16.9 (43)	19.9 (51)	13.9 (35)	5.3 (13)	0.1 (0.25)	0.0 (0.0)	0.0 (0.0)	0.0 (0.0)	0.0 (0.0)	0.4 (1.0)	5.2 (13)	17.4 (44)	79.1 (200.25)
Average precipitation days (≥ 0.01 in)	16.4	14.3	13.2	13.7	15.1	16.0	15.1	13.4	12.2	14.6	14.8	18.5	177.3
Average snowy days (≥ 0.1 in)	13.3	12.4	8.6	3.3	0.1	0.0	0.0	0.0	0.0	0.4	5.3	12.9	56.3
Source 1: NOAA
Source 2: XMACIS2

== Notable person ==
- Minik Wallace (1890-1918), Inuit brought to the United States from Greenland by explorer Robert Peary in 1897
