= Warren's Gore, Vermont =

Coordinates: 44°54′44″N 71°53′10″W

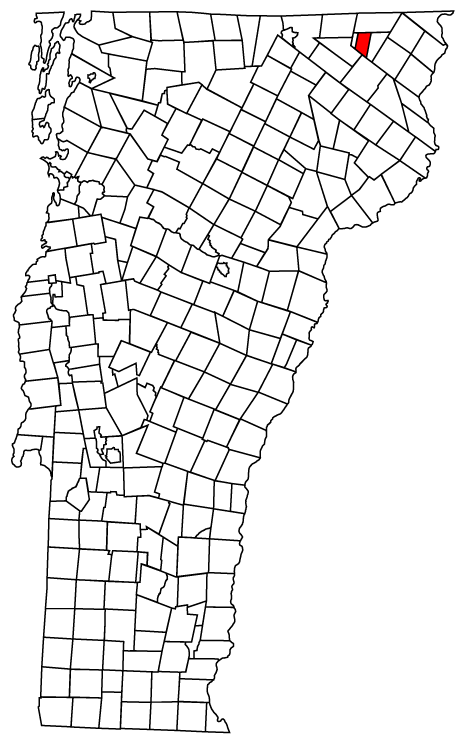
- Located in Essex County, Vermont
- Country: United States
- State: Vermont
- County: Essex

Population (2020)
  - Total: 2

Warren's Gore (or Warrens Gore or Warren Gore) is a gore in Essex County, Vermont, United States. The population was 2 at the 2020 census, down from 4 at the 2010 census. In Vermont, gores and grants are unincorporated portions of a county which are not part of any town and have limited self-government (if any, as many are uninhabited). Warren's Gore is part of the Berlin, NH–VT Micropolitan Statistical Area.

== History ==
Warren's Gore was originally chartered to be part of the town of Warren on October 20, 1789. The charter provided for two tracts of land, one which became the town and the other which became the gore. They were almost 100 miles from each other, on opposite sides of the state. Why they were chartered together is still uncertain, but it is possible that this was due to the tract of land for the grant that became the town of Warren being smaller than most; the inclusion of the gore would therefore have been a tactic to increase the total land area. The tract that became the gore has been treated as separate from the town since its inception. The charter referred to the two tracts collectively as "a Township by the name of Warren".

While the place was known as Warren's Gore, including in Vermont state statutes, the U.S. Board on Geographic Names eschews the use of apostrophes in geographic names, which may improperly imply personal possession. This has led to the use of both Warrens Gore and Warren Gore as well. The Vermont Atlas and Gazetteer (Delorme, 9th ed., 1996) uses Warren Gore on the relevant map (p. 55) but also uses Warrens Gore (with no apostrophe) for the gore's entry in the index (p. 7).

== Geography ==
According to the United States Census Bureau, the gore has a total area of 11.4 square miles (29.5 km^{2}), of which 10.5 square miles (27.3 km^{2}) is land and 0.81 square miles (2.1 km^{2}), or 7.26%, is water. The gore contains the majority of Norton Pond, the source of the Coaticook River, which flows north into Quebec. Less than one mile south of Norton Pond is the source of the Pherrins River, which flows south to Island Pond and is part of the Clyde River (Lake Memphremagog) watershed.

Vermont Route 114 passes through Warrens Gore, leading north to Norton and south to Island Pond.

== Demographics ==
Historical population
Year	Pop.	±%
1940	0	—
1950	1	—
1960	0	−100.0%
1970	1	—
1980	0	−100.0%
1990	2	—
2000	10	+400.0%
2010	4	−60.0%
2020	2	−50.0%

As of the census of 2000, there were 10 people, 4 households, and 4 families residing in the gore. The population density was 0.9 inhabitants per square mile (0.35/km^{2}). There were 43 housing units at an average density of 3.9 per square mile (1.5/km^{2}). The racial makeup of the gore was 100.00% white.

There were 4 households, out of which 25.0% had children under the age of 18 living with them, 100.0% were married couples living together, and 0.0% were non-families. No households were made up of individuals, and none had someone living alone who was 65 years of age or older. The average household size was 2.50 and the average family size was 2.50.

In the gore the population was spread out, with 20.0% under the age of 18, 30.0% from 25 to 44, 30.0% from 45 to 64, and 20.0% who were 65 years of age or older. The median age was 46 years. For every 100 females, there were 150.0 males. For every 100 females age 18 and over, there were 100.0 males.

== See also ==
- Pherrins River, Vermont
