= Charleston, Vermont =

- Town
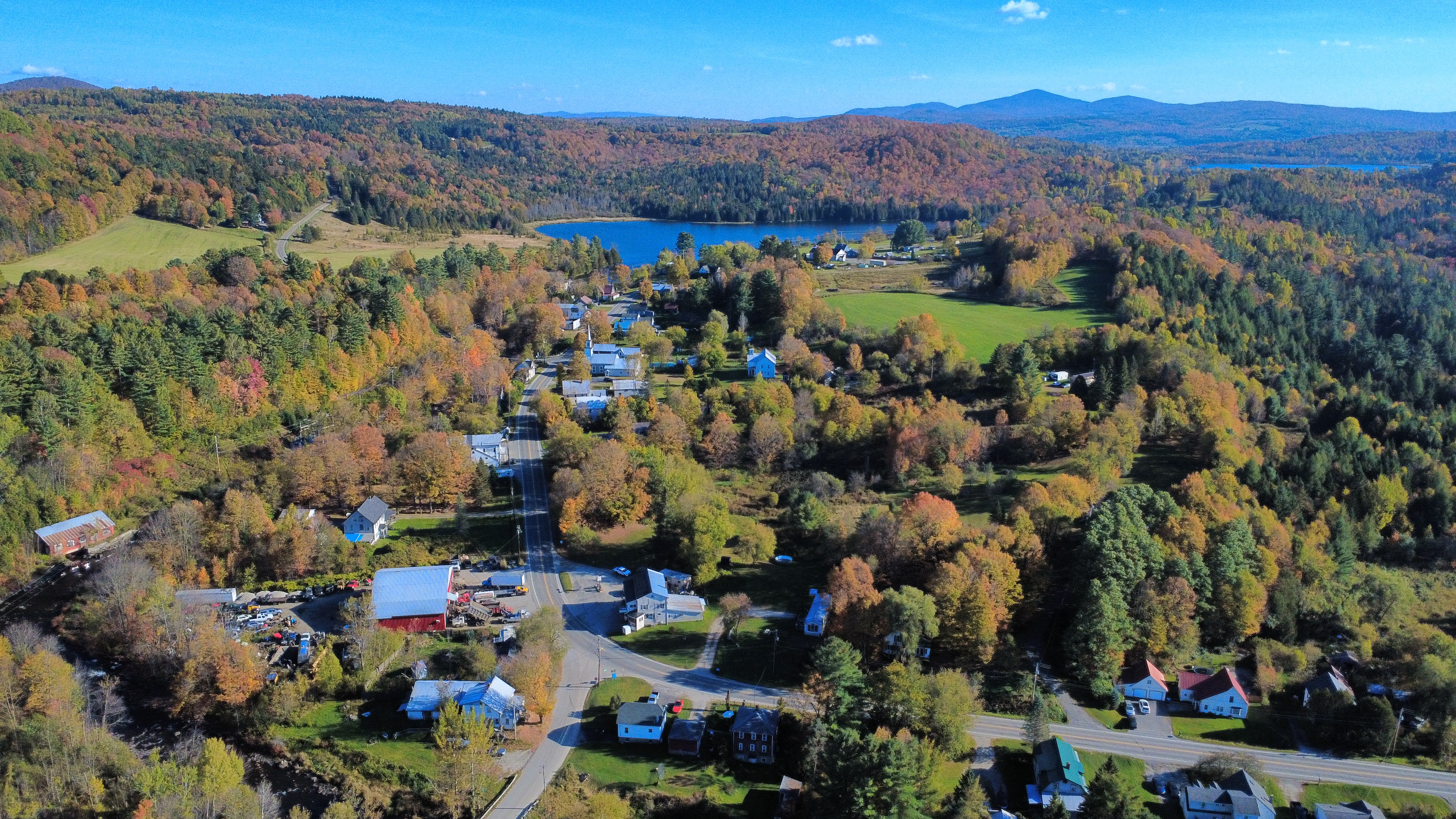
- West Charleston, VT, from the northwest

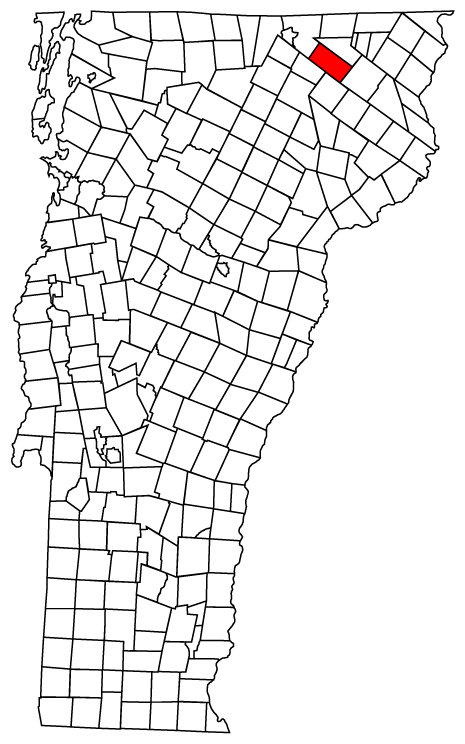
- Located in Orleans County, Vermont
- Coordinates: 44°51′02″N 72°00′47″W
- Country: United States
- State: Vermont
- County: Orleans
- Chartered: November 10, 1780
- Communities: East Charleston; West Charleston

Area
  - Total: 38.6 sq mi (100.0 km^{2})
  - Land: 37.5 sq mi (97.1 km^{2})
  - Water: 1.1 sq mi (2.9 km^{2})
- Elevation: 1,335 ft (407 m)

Population (2020)
  - Total: 1,021
  - Density: 27/sq mi (10.5/km^{2})
- Time zone: UTC-5 (EST)
  - Summer (DST): UTC-4 (EDT)
- ZIP Codes: 05833 (East Charleston); 05872 (West Charleston); 05846 (Island Pond)
- Area code: 802
- FIPS code: 50-13150
- GNIS feature ID: 1462067
- Website: charlestonvt.org

Charleston is a town in Orleans County, Vermont, United States. The population was 1,021 at the 2020 census. The town contains two unincorporated villages: East Charleston and West Charleston.

== History ==
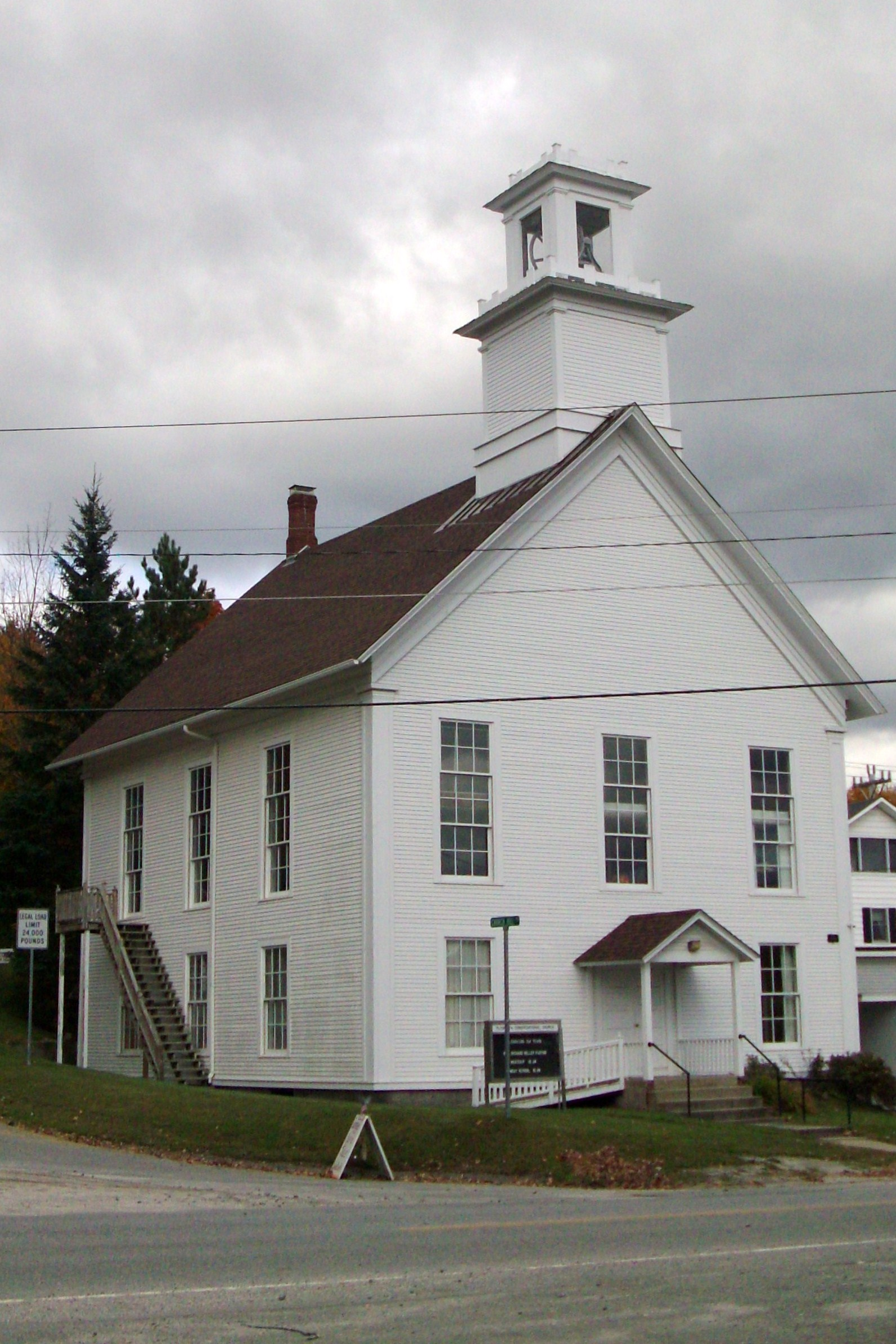
The Plymouth Congregational Church on VT Rte 105 in East Charleston

Native Abenakis told of how a large pond "ran away" similar to Runaway Pond in the 1780s before the area was explored by the descendants of Europeans.

Commodore Abraham Whipple was given a grant to the town, along with 50–60 of his shipmates. He called it "Navy". Abner Allen, from Barton, Vermont, was the first settler in 1803.

In 1825, the town of Navy changed its name to Charleston, presumably after a naval battle that had occurred off Charleston, South Carolina.

During the Civil War, Charleston furnished 121 enlisted men, 35 of whom were killed in action or died from the effects of wounds or disease contracted while in the service.

In the late 19th and early 20th centuries, the town had a number of mills. The population hit a high of 1700.

A round barn (not uncommon for the time and place) was erected in Charleston in 1908. It was possibly the largest such structure in New England. The barn burned to the ground in 1918, though the large stone foundation can still be seen along the Ten Mile Square Road.

A series of fires destroyed East Charleston May 18, 1921, and West Charleston on the following day.

== Geography ==
According to the United States Census Bureau, the town has a total area of 38.6 square miles (100.0 km^{2}), of which 37.5 square miles (97.1 km^{2}) is land and 1.1 square miles (2.9 km^{2}) (2.93%) is water.

The Clyde River is the largest stream in the town. It flows into Charleston, in a northwesterly direction nearly through its center. Falls are found on the river, especially in the western part of town, where it drops more than 100 feet (30 m) in 660 feet (201 m), but its current is generally slow.

Echo Lake, situated in the easterly part of the town, receives the waters of Lake Seymour in Morgan, and through that the waters of Holland Pond. Echo Lake is one mile (1.6 km) from East Charleston. It is one mile (1.6 km) and a half long and one mile (1.6 km) wide. General Whitelaw gave it the name of Echo Pond because when any sound was produced in its vicinity, it reverberated in various directions, producing a series of echoes.

Pensioners Pond is the next in size, and was so named because of the pension of a revolutionary soldier who employed its water power.

Toad Pond is above Pensioners Pond, near the great swamp on the Brownington line. Broadway Pond is near the Morgan line.

The southwest part of town is delimited from its neighbor, the town of Brownington, by Chilafoux Road, which runs northwest-southeast, for about half its length.

== Demographics ==
Historical population
Census	Pop.	Note	%±
1810	56		—
1820	90		60.7%
1830	564		526.7%
1840	731		29.6%
1850	1,008		37.9%
1860	1,160		15.1%
1870	1,278		10.2%
1880	1,204		−5.8%
1890	1,058		−12.1%
1900	1,025		−3.1%
1910	993		−3.1%
1920	921		−7.3%
1930	895		−2.8%
1940	834		−6.8%
1950	764		−8.4%
1960	668		−12.6%
1970	654		−2.1%
1980	851		30.1%
1990	844		−0.8%
2000	895		6.0%
2010	1,023		14.3%
2020	1,021		−0.2%
U.S. Decennial Census

As of the census of 2000, there were 895 people, 362 households, and 261 families residing in the town. The population density was 23.9 people per square mile (9.2/km^{2}). There were 587 housing units at an average density of 15.7 per square mile (6.0/km^{2}). The racial makeup of the town was 96.42% White, 1.34% Native American, 0.34% Asian, and 1.90% from two or more races. Hispanic or Latino of any race were 0.45% of the population.

There were 362 households, out of which 30.4% had children under the age of 18 living with them, 54.7% were married couples living together, 9.9% had a female householder with no husband present, and 27.9% were non-families. 19.9% of all households were made up of individuals, and 5.2% had someone living alone who was 65 years of age or older. The average household size was 2.47 and the average family size was 2.80.

In the town, the population was spread out, with 24.4% under the age of 18, 7.9% from 18 to 24, 24.8% from 25 to 44, 31.2% from 45 to 64, and 11.7% who were 65 years of age or older. The median age was 41 years. For every 100 females, there were 97.6 males. For every 100 females age 18 and over, there were 99.1 males.

The median income for a household in the town was $28,083, and the median income for a family was $31,250. Males had a median income of $25,938 versus $19,911 for females. The per capita income for the town was $15,278. About 16.4% of families and 20.0% of the population were below the poverty line, including 29.6% of those under age 18 and 23.9% of those age 65 or over.

== Local government ==
=== Town ===
- Selectboard – Patrick Austin, Peter Moskovites, Tim Jenness
- Town Clerk – Teri Gray
- Town Budget – $1,000,234

The proposed budget of $1,000,234, $935,659 of which was allocated to road maintenance, cemetery maintenance, and selectboard operations was approved at the town meeting March 7, 2023.

=== School District ===
- Member, North Country Union High School Board – Peter Moscovites
- School Board Chair – Nancy Tessier
- Member, School Board – Jason Brueck, East Charleston; Bill McMaster (2009)
- Number of students – 100 (current and projected)
- Number of students in 2004 – 128
- School Budget for 2023 – $2,664,868

The Elementary school had 70% of the students qualified for free or reduced lunches. This was the highest percentage in the county in 2011.

== Notable people ==
- Benjamin Hunkins, pioneer and Wisconsin territorial and state legislator, was born in Charleston
- Robert Mills, Particle physicist; died in East Charleston, Vermont in 1999
