= Luther A. Cole =

19th century Wisconsin pioneer

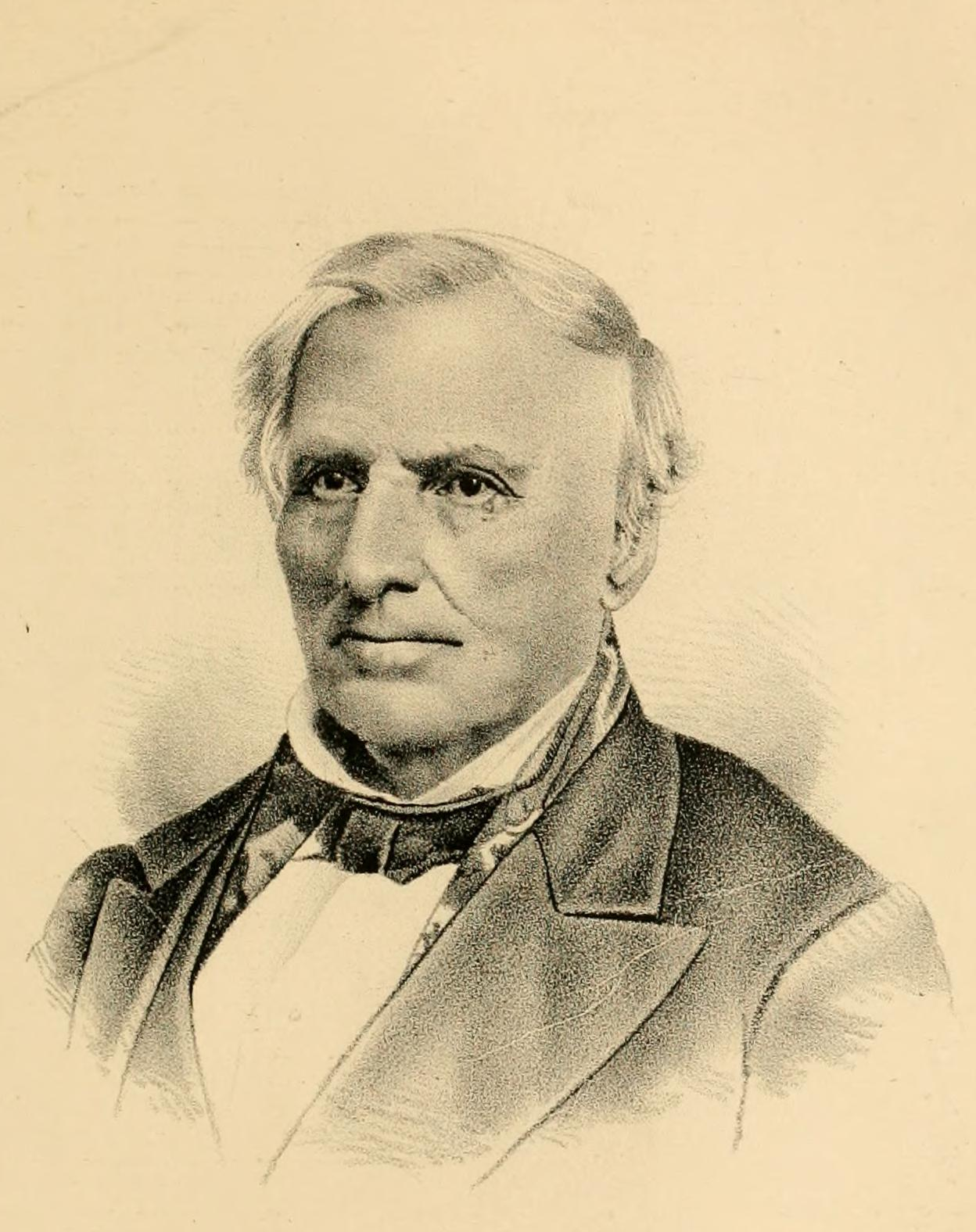
- Portrait from The History of Jefferson County, Wisconsin (1879)

Member of the Wisconsin State Assembly from the Jefferson 3rd district
- In office January 3, 1859 – January 2, 1860
- Preceded by: Peter Rogan
- Succeeded by: Heber Smith

Personal details
- Born: November 1, 1812 West Charleston, Vermont, U.S.
- Died: June 22, 1880 (aged 67) Denver, Colorado, U.S.
- Resting place: Riverside Cemetery, Denver, Colorado
- Party: Republican
- Spouse: Mary Jane Brackett (m. 1842–1880)
- Children: Martha Cole^{(died 1845)}; Uranah Brackett (Clark)^{(b. 1847; died 1935)}; Guy G. Cole^{(b. 1849; died 1853)}; Guy L. Cole^{(b. 1857; died 1934)}
- Relatives: Ebenezer W. Cole (brother); John W. Cole (brother); Zenas C. Cole (brother)

Military service
- Allegiance: United States
- Branch/service: Wisconsin Militia
- Rank: Brig. General
- Battles/wars: American Civil War

Luther Anderson Cole (November 1, 1812 – June 22, 1880) was an American businessman, Republican politician, and Wisconsin pioneer. He was the second American settler at what is now the city of Watertown, Wisconsin, and represented Watertown for one term in the Wisconsin State Assembly (1859).

== Early life ==
Luther Cole was born in West Charleston, Orleans County, Vermont, in November 1812. His father was a farmer and carpenter, and Luther was brought up working with his father in those trades. He had very little formal education.

In the Winter of 1834, at age 22, he traveled west to the new territories, settling first at Detroit, Michigan Territory. The following spring, he took a schooner, the Supply, on a voyage into the Great Lakes, stopping briefly at Green Bay, then landing at the mouth of the Grand River. He labored there for about a year building mills and houses at Grand Haven, but decided to look for land to settle on the west side of Lake Michigan.

== Pioneer years in Wisconsin ==
In 1836, he traveled to Chicago by schooner in the company of Elisha M. Osborn and Philander Baldwin. The three men then walked north along Indian trails, arriving at the village of Milwaukee on May 10, 1836. He worked for the rest of the year as a carpenter and joiner in Milwaukee, but through a friend, made a claim of land to the west at what was then known as Johnson's Rapids—now Watertown, Wisconsin. That December, he went west to his claim, accompanied by Amasa Hyland, and was joined soon after by his younger brother, John. The three men built a cabin there—it was the second cabin at the site, the first had been constructed by Timothy Johnson. He spent the next two years clearing land and establishing a farm, and in 1838, when the land legally came to market, he was able to prove a preemption on the land. At that time, he also purchased several more acres in Dodge County, just north of the city. His older brother, Ebenezer, and younger brother, Zenas, also soon joined the settlement.

In 1841, Cole and his brother John opened the first store in Watertown, stocking it with roughly $1,000 (~$31,210 in 2025) worth of merchandise. But Cole's primary source of income was through the construction and operation of mills on the Rock River. Throughout the early years at Watertown, Cole worked to construct several buildings in the settlement, including a saw mill on the land owned by Selvay Kidder. In 1842, Cole and an associate made an agreement with Kidder to purchase his 750 acres—comprising much of what is now downtown Watertown—agreeing to pay in exchange 1,000,000 feet of timber to be delivered in installments over the next seven years. Cole and his partners paid it off within three years. Cole went on to construct several additional mills on the land.

== Public offices ==
Cole was appointed deputy sheriff of Milwaukee County in 1838—at that time, most of southeast Wisconsin was still under the administration of Milwaukee County. The town of Watertown was first organized in 1842, and at the first election, Cole was elected town treasurer. He was subsequently re-elected for 1843 and 1844. In 1844, Cole was elected sheriff of Jefferson County, serving until 1847.

Cole associated with the Whig Party and went along with many other northern Whigs into the new Republican Party when it was established in the 1850s. He served one term in the Wisconsin State Assembly, in the 1859 session. He was elected from Jefferson County's 3rd Assembly district, which at that time comprised just the city of Watertown.

At the outbreak of the American Civil War, Cole was appointed brigadier general of the 2nd brigade of Wisconsin militia and assisted in raising volunteers as commissioner of the county enrollment board. The rank of "general" was for organizational purposes in the state, he did not receive a rank from the federal government, and did not command any of Wisconsin's Union Army regiments.

== Later years ==
In 1866, Cole traveled to the Nebraska Territory, where he set up a new mill in the vicinity of Omaha, and the next year established a mill on the Platte River, near Denver. In 1869, he sold off all of his remaining mills and invested the money in commercial property and mining land in Denver. Cole maintained his primary residence in Waterford, but made frequent trips to Denver to look after his property. During one such trip, he fell ill and was unable to return. He died at Denver on June 22, 1880.

== Personal life and family ==
Luther Cole was the son of Ebenezer Cole and his wife Martha (née West). Ebenezer Cole was one of the first settlers at Charleston, Vermont.

Luther Cole had at least five brothers, three of those brothers—John, Ebenezer, and Zenas—worked with him at some time in Watertown, Wisconsin. John, who was two years younger, was most extensively connected to his brother in business, eventually taking over one of the two original parcels of land Luther Cole had claimed near Watertown in 1836.

In 1842, Cole briefly returned to Vermont, where he met and married Mary Jane Brackett. They had four children together, but two died in childhood.
