= West Charleston =

West Charleston may refer to:

- West Charleston, Ohio
- West Charleston, Vermont
- West Charleston Boulevard, Nevada
