= Pherrins River =

Location
- Country: United States
- State: Vermont
- Region: Northeast Kingdom
- City: Island Pond

Physical characteristics
- Source: Mountain Brook
  - location: Warrens Gore, Essex County, Vermont, United States
  - coordinates: 44°53′45″N 71°53′21″W
  - elevation: 2,444 ft (745 m)
- Mouth: Clyde River (Vermont)
  - location: Island Pond, Vermont, Essex County, Vermont, United States
  - coordinates: 44°48′40″N 71°53′21″W
  - elevation: 1,177 ft (359 m)
- Length: 9.9 mi (15.9 km)
- Discharge
  - location: Island Pond, Vermont

Basin features
- Tributaries
  - left: Pine brook

The Pherrins River is a tributary of the Clyde River, flowing in Essex County and Orleans County in northern Vermont in United States.

The valley of the river Pherrins is a convenient passage for connecting the Island Pond to the Norton Pond which is the head of water of the Coaticook River flowing to the northeast across the border of Quebec and Vermont.

== Geography ==
The source of the river is located in the area of Warren's Gore, Vermont, on the northwest flank of Bluff Mountain in Essex County, Vermont. This source is located at:

- 1.0 kilometre (0.62 mi) West of a summit of the Bluff Mountain;
- 3.1 kilometres (1.9 mi) Southwest of the summit of the Middle Mountain;
- 2.3 kilometres (1.4 mi) Northeast of the border of Orleans County;
- 8.6 kilometres (5.3 mi) North of Island Pond.

From its source, the river Pherrins flows on 16.9 kilometres (10.5 mi) according to the following segments:

- 1.9 kilometres (1.2 mi) toward the Northwest racing down the cliff on 324 metres (1,063 ft) down to the railway crossing the valley of Pherrins River and the Coaticook River;
- 2.5 kilometres (1.6 mi) toward the Southwest, crossing two small lakes up to the confluence of a stream (from the North);
- 0.5 kilometres (0.31 mi) toward Southwest, up to the limit of Orleans County;
- 1.2 kilometres (0.75 mi) toward the Southwest, collecting the waters of a mountain stream (from the Northwest) up to the Pine Brook (from the East);
- 2.1 kilometres (1.3 mi) to the South up to the discharge of Underpass Pond (from the East);
- 2.8 kilometres (1.7 mi) to the South up to the limit of Essex County;
- 5.9 kilometres (3.7 mi) to the Southeast up to its confluence

The Pherrins River empties on the Northwest shore of the Clyde River at 0.9 kilometres (0.56 mi) downstream from the mouth of the Island Pond in the area of Brighton, Vermont. This confluence is located on the west side of Island Pond.

== Toponymy ==
The toponym "River Pherrins" was formalized on October 29, 1980, at the Geographic Names Information System (GNIS) of US federal government.

== See also ==
- Lake Memphremagog, a body of water straddling the Quebec and Vermont
- Clyde River (Vermont), a stream
- Warren's Gore, Vermont
- Brighton, Vermont
- List of rivers of Vermont
- List of rivers of the United States
