= Morgan, Vermont =

- Town
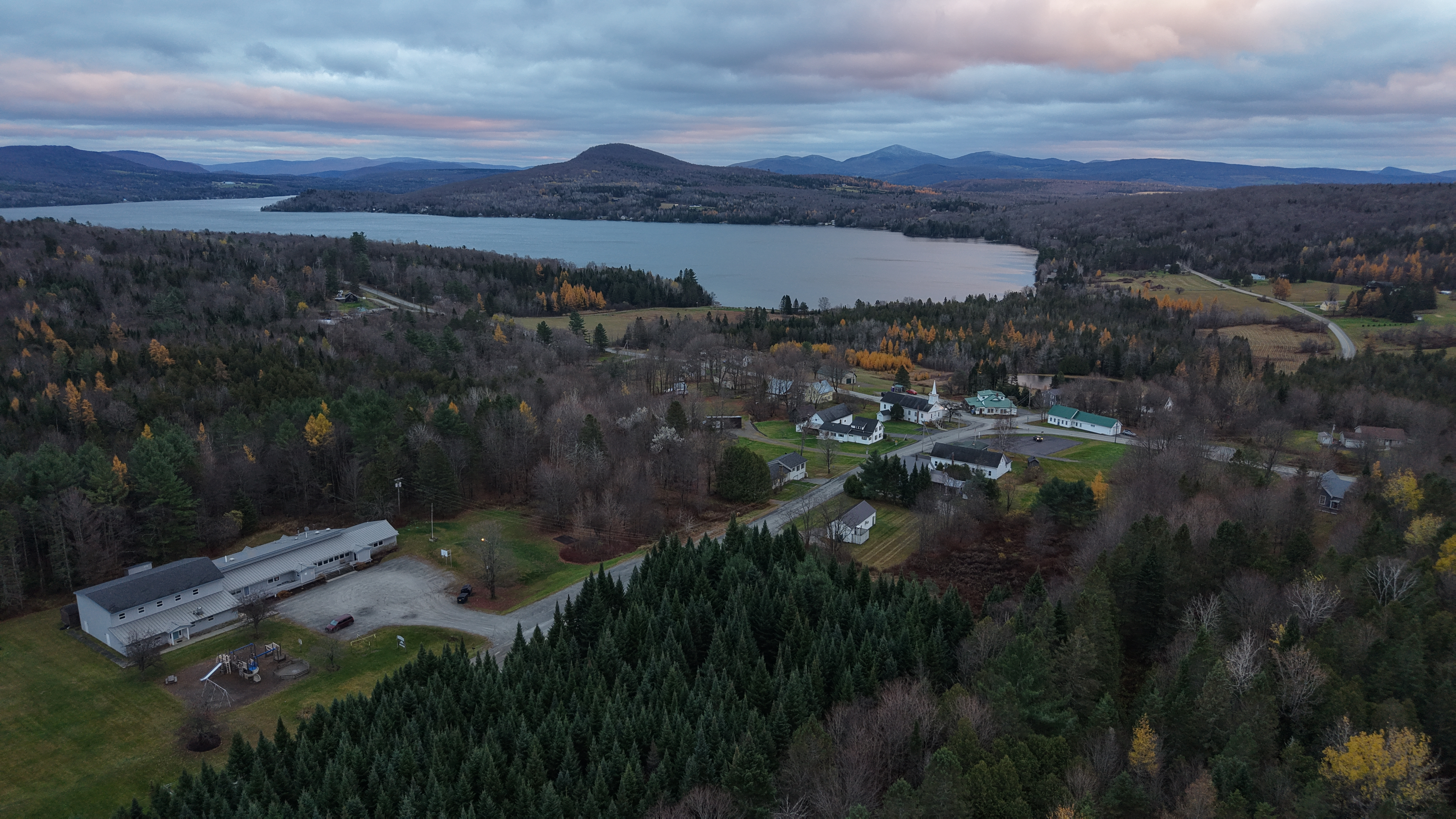
- Morgan, VT, from the north

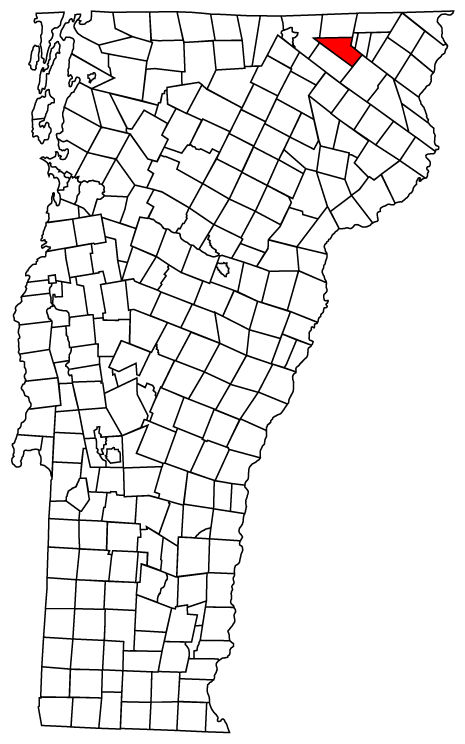
- Located in Orleans County, Vermont
- Coordinates: 44°53′47″N 71°58′10″W
- Country: United States
- State: Vermont
- County: Orleans
- Chartered: November 6, 1780
- Communities: Morgan; Morgan Center

Area
  - Total: 33.9 sq mi (87.7 km^{2})
  - Land: 31.3 sq mi (81.0 km^{2})
  - Water: 2.6 sq mi (6.8 km^{2})
- Elevation: 1,460 ft (450 m)

Population (2020)
  - Total: 638
  - Density: 20/sq mi (7.9/km^{2})
- Time zone: UTC-5 (EST)
  - Summer (DST): UTC-4 (EDT)
- ZIP Codes: 05853 (Morgan); 05829 (Derby); 05872 (West Charleston)
- Area code: 802
- FIPS code: 50-46450
- GNIS feature ID: 1462275
- Website: townofmorgan.com

Morgan is the easternmost town in Orleans County, Vermont, United States. The population was 638 at the 2020 census. The town contains two villages: Morgan and Morgan Center.

== History ==
The town was named for John Morgan, a landholder.

The first settler was Nathan Wilcox in 1800.

During the Civil War the town furnished forty-seven enlisted men, thirteen of whom were killed or died from the effects of wounds or disease.

== Geography ==
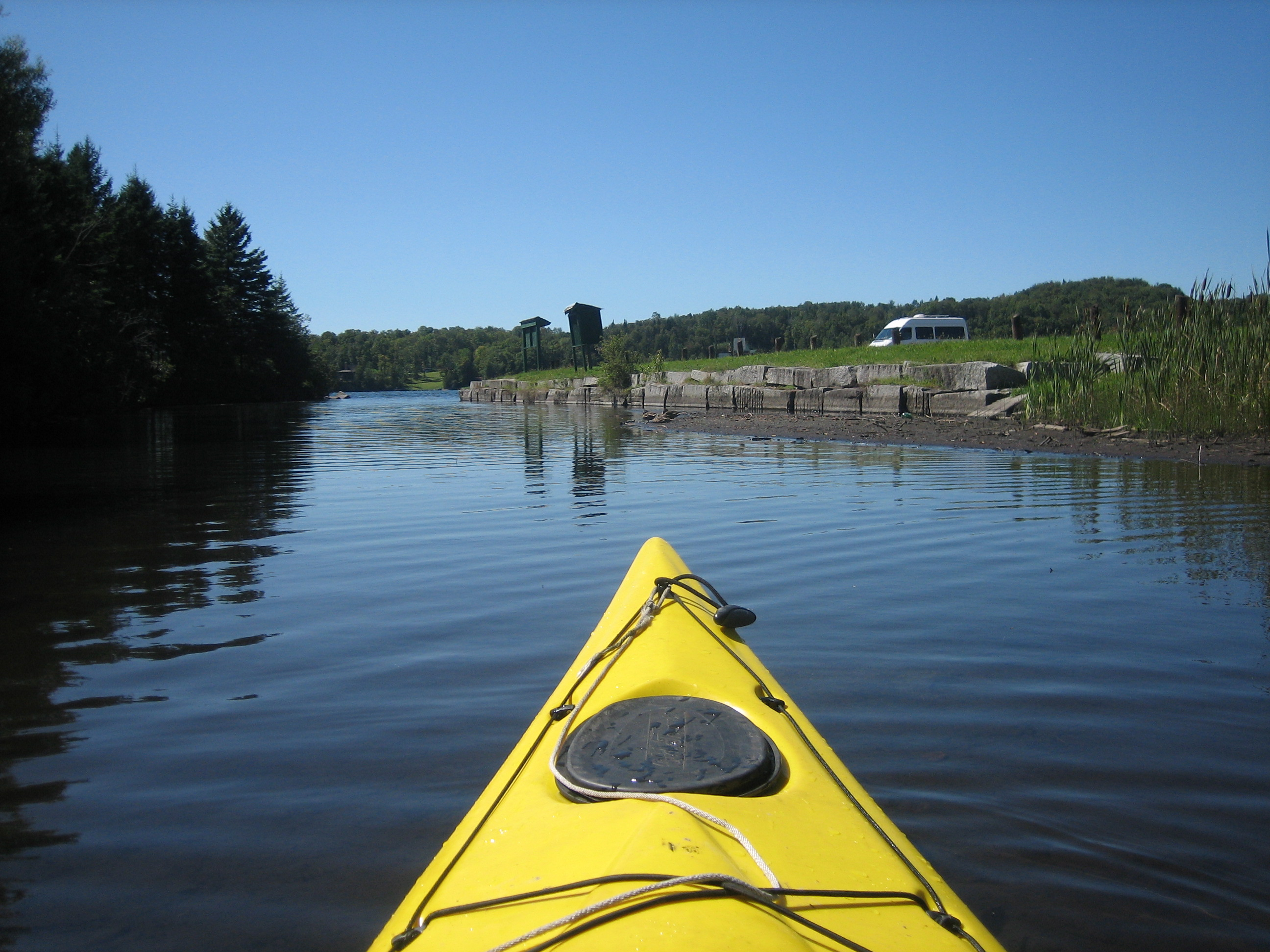
Seymour Lake in Morgan Vermont

According to the United States Census Bureau, the town has a total area of 33.9 square miles (87.7 km^{2}), of which 31.3 square miles (81.0 km^{2}) is land and 2.6 square miles (6.8 km^{2}) (7.71%) is water.

Lake Seymour is contained entirely within the town. It covers 1,732 acres (7.01 km^{2}). It is the third largest lake to be contained solely within the state., after Willoughby Lake and Lake Bomoseen

== Demographics ==
Historical population
Census	Pop.	Note	%±
1810	135		—
1820	116		−14.1%
1830	331		185.3%
1840	422		27.5%
1850	486		15.2%
1860	548		12.8%
1870	614		12.0%
1880	711		15.8%
1890	520		−26.9%
1900	510		−1.9%
1910	463		−9.2%
1920	368		−20.5%
1930	363		−1.4%
1940	335		−7.7%
1950	296		−11.6%
1960	260		−12.2%
1970	286		10.0%
1980	460		60.8%
1990	497		8.0%
2000	669		34.6%
2010	749		12.0%
2020	638		−14.8%
U.S. Decennial Census

As of the census of 2000, there were 669 people, 247 households, and 185 families residing in the town. The population density was 21.4 people per square mile (8.3/km^{2}). There were 672 housing units at an average density of 21.5 per square mile (8.3/km^{2}). The racial makeup of the town was 98.21% White, 0.30% African American, 0.60% Native American, 0.15% Asian, 0.15% from other races, and 0.60% from two or more races. Hispanic or Latino of any race were 0.90% of the population.

There were 247 households, out of which 35.6% had children under the age of 18 living with them, 61.9% were married couples living together, 8.9% had a female householder with no husband present, and 25.1% were non-families. 18.2% of all households were made up of individuals, and 4.9% had someone living alone who was 65 years of age or older. The average household size was 2.71 and the average family size was 3.03.

In the town, the population was spread out, with 29.4% under the age of 18, 4.0% from 18 to 24, 27.2% from 25 to 44, 28.1% from 45 to 64, and 11.2% who were 65 years of age or older. The median age was 38 years. For every 100 females, there were 108.4 males. For every 100 females age 18 and over, there were 95.0 males.

The median income for a household in the town was $37,292, and the median income for a family was $42,344. Males had a median income of $28,542 versus $18,125 for females. The per capita income for the town was $15,565. About 10.9% of families and 15.0% of the population were below the poverty line, including 20.7% of those under age 18 and 14.9% of those age 65 or over.

== Government ==
=== Politics ===
Ninety percent of those registered turned out to vote in the 2008 general election, highest in the county.

Morgan town vote by party in presidential elections
Year	Democratic	Republican	Third Parties
2024	40.48% 168	55.90% 232	3.61% 15
2020	42.68% 172	54.09% 218	3.23% 13
2016	29.53% 101	57.60% 197	12.87% 44
2012	47.37% 162	51.17% 175	1.46% 5
2008	50.92% 193	47.49% 180	1.58% 6
2004	44.04% 159	55.12% 199	0.83% 3
2000	39.26% 137	53.30% 186	7.45% 26
1996	40.43% 114	37.94% 107	21.63% 61
1992	31.42% 104	34.74% 115	33.84% 112

In modern times, Morgan, Vermont is a mostly Republican jurisdiction. The GOP candidates have carried Morgan in five of the last seven presidential elections. In 2008, Barack Obama became the lone Democratic presidential candidate in the last thirty years to win a majority of the vote. Morgan was one of only two Vermont towns to vote for Mitt Romney over Barack Obama in the 2012 presidential election. In 2016, Donald Trump improved on Romney's performance, and won the town by a margin of 27 points.
