= Clyde River (Vermont) =

Location
- Country: United States
- State: Vermont
- Region: Northeast Kingdom
- City: Newport, Vermont

Physical characteristics
- Source: Spectacle Pond; Island Pond
  - location: Essex County, Vermont, United States
  - coordinates: 44°48′2″N 71°51′1″W
  - elevation: 1,275 ft (389 m)
- Mouth: Lake Memphremagog
  - location: Newport (city), Vermont, Orleans County, Vermont, United States
  - coordinates: 44°56′39″N 72°12′16″W
  - elevation: 682 ft (208 m)
- Length: 33.5 mi (53.9 km)
- Basin size: 146 mi^{2} (380 km^{2})
- Discharge
  - location: Newport, Vermont

Basin features
- Tributaries
  - left: (from the mouth) Toad Pound discharge, Buck Brook, Mad Brook, Cold Brook, Payne Brook.
  - right: (from the mouth) Stumpf Brook, Echo Lake discharge, Lang Brook, Mud Ponds, Pherrins River, Vermont.

The Clyde River is a tributary of Lake Memphremagog, over 33.5 miles (54 km) long, in northern Vermont in the United States. It is the easternmost of the four major rivers in Orleans County. It is the most powerful of the four within Orleans County, powering several turbines at damsites. It is part of the Northern Forest Canoe Trail.

It was named by one of the early surveyors from his partiality to a river of the same name in Scotland.

The Route 105/114 junction to Clyde Road section of Clyde River in Vermont is 21 miles (34 km) long and is rated by American Whitewater as a class I-III section.

== Geography ==
It drains the water from about 146 square miles (378 km^{2}). With the exception of three miles (5 km) of rapids near its mouth, this is a very sluggish stream, passing through in its course, several natural ponds of considerable size. Even during spring high water, there is barely a perceptible current.

=== Course ===
The river has its source in Spectacle Pond (length: 1.4 kilometres or 0.87 miles; altitude: 357 metres or 1,171 feet) in Brighton. The Southern part of Spectacle Pond is part of Brighton State Park. Spectacle Pond is actually a kettle. It is only 8 to 10 feet (2.4 to 3.0 m) deep with a thick bottom of muck.

From the mouth of Spectacle Pond, the Clyde river flows on 53.9 kilometres (33.5 mi) as follows:

Higher course of the river (segment of 4.9 kilometres (3.0 mi))

- 0.3 kilometres (0.19 mi) toward Northwest up to East bank of Island Pond;
- 1.8 kilometres (1.1 mi) toward Northwest crossing the Island Pond (length: 2.8 kilometres (1.7 mi); altitude: 357 metres (1,171 ft)) toward Island Pond up to the mouth of the pond
- 0.9 kilometres (0.56 mi) toward the Southwest crossing the city of Island Pond et passing at South of Bluff Mountain, up to the confluence of Pherrins River (coming from North).

Pherrins River which is the main tributary of Clyde River, empties into the Clyde River from the north at 0.9 kilometres (0.56 mi) below the outlet, frequently rises quite suddenly, swelling the waters of the latter so as to reverse its current and cause it to back up into Island Pond with great force for ten hours or more, until the pond is full, or the water subsides below, when it will again change and rush out.

Intermediary course of the river (segment of 26.6 kilometres (16.5 mi))

From the mouth of Pherrins River, the Clyde River flow as follow:

- 3.1 kilometres (1.9 mi) toward Southwest, up to Oswegatchie Pond (coming from South);
- 4.8 kilometres (3.0 mi) toward Northwest, snaking between Rosebrook Hill (located on South side) and Dollif Mountain (located on North side) up to the discharge of Mud Pounds (coming from North);
- 0.6 kilometres (0.37 mi) toward Northwest, up to the limit of Charleston;
- 0.2 kilometres (0.12 mi) toward Northwest in Charleston, up to the discharge (coming from North-East) of a lake;
- 0.6 kilometres (0.37 mi) toward Northwest, un to Lang Brook (coming from North);
- 1.5 kilometres (0.93 mi) toward North-West by passing an island at the end of this segment, up to Back Brook (coming from the South);
- 0.8 kilometres (0.50 mi) toward Northwest, up to Mad Brook (coming from South);
- 2.5 kilometres (1.6 mi) toward Northwest, passing at Northeast of Deer Hill (altitude of summit: 412 metres (1,352 ft)), up to the discharge (coming from North) of Lake Echo (altitude: 380 metres (1,250 ft)) and from Lake Seymour (altitude: 390 metres (1,280 ft)); the confluence of this discharge is located at the South of East Charleston village;
- 7.2 kilometres (4.5 mi) toward Northwest, splitting in two for bypassing an island (length: 0.9 kilometres (0.56 mi)), then snaking up to the discharge (coming from South) of Toad Pond;
- 5.3 kilometres (3.3 mi) (or 2.1 kilometres (1.3 mi) in direct line) toward Northwest, up to South bank of Pensionner Pond.

Lower course of the river (segment of 22.4 kilometres (13.9 mi))

- 1.8 kilometres (1.1 mi) Northward crossing Pensioner Pond (altitude: 1,135 feet (346 m)) up to the mouth where the lake is narrowing and curving to Northwest;
- 0.7 kilometres (0.43 mi) Northward up to the South bank of Charleston Pond;
- 0.8 kilometres (0.50 mi) Northward up to the dam at the mouth of Charleston Pond (altitude: 1,020 feet (310 m));
- 4.3 kilometres (2.7 mi) to Northwest up to South bank of a lake;
- 1.4 kilometres (0.87 mi) to Northwest up to the confluence of the lake which is linked to Lake Salem by a strait of 0.2 kilometres (0.12 mi);
- 2.4 kilometres (1.5 mi) to Northwest crossing Lake Salem (altitude: 958 feet (292 m)) up to the mouth;
- 6.4 kilometres (4.0 mi) Westward forming a curve to North, crossing the Interstate 91 and snaking up to the dam located at the Northeast end of Clyde Pond #1;
- 1.4 kilometres (0.87 mi) to Southwest, crossing Clyde Pond #1 (altitude: 869 feet (265 m)), up to the dam on West bank of the pond;
- 3.2 kilometres (2.0 mi) to West up crossing the city of Newport up to the confluence at the South bank of the Lake Memphremagog (altitude: 679 feet (207 m)).

=== Charleston ===
The Clyde River is the largest in Charleston. It runs nearly through the center of the town. Some falls of importance are found on the stream, especially the Great Falls in the western part of the town, where the descent is more than 100 feet (30 m) in 66 feet (20 m); but its current is generally slow.

=== Derby ===
The Clyde River forms the principal water-course, flowing through the town from east to west.

After exiting from Clyde Pond #1, it proceeds westward. It empties into Lake Salem from the south. It exits the northwest corner of this lake. It is then joined by an unnamed brook from Derby Pond from the north. It then empties into Clyde Pond #2 from the northeast. It exits this Pond west and into south Lake Memphremagog from the north. The mouth is just east of where US 5/Vermont 105 crosses Lake Memphremagog.

== Natural history ==
Beavers populate the countryside and sometimes undercut the streamside silver maple, toppling them into the water and creating logjams.

The river winds through farm country, with silver maple and alder dominating the shoreline. Northern white cedar, an occasional willow, and a variety of shrubs line the 40-foot (12 m) wide waterway, and vegetation dips right into the water.

== History ==
=== Toponymy ===
The term "Clyde" is a popular first name with English origin. This term is also used as surname.

This toponym was officialized on October 29, 1980 at Geographic Names Information System (GNIS) of US federal government.

=== Dams ===
In the early 19th century a mill dam constructed at Arnolds Falls. In 1883 a dam was constructed at the outlet to Lake Memphremagog. In 1918 the Newport Dam (Clyde Pond #2) was constructed. This dam was also known as Prouty Dam (after Governor Prouty). It was 713 feet (217 m) long. This was also known as the Clyde Pond dam.

The Echo Lake dam is not used for hydroelectric power. Construction was completed in 1922. It has a normal surface area of 530 acres (2.1 km^{2}). It is owned by Great Bay Hydro Corporation. The dam is concrete. The core is homogeneous concrete. The foundation is rock. The height is 16 by 120 feet (4.9 by 36.6 m). Maximum discharge is 693 cubic feet (19.6 m^{3}) per second. Its capacity is 5,000 acre-feet (6,200,000 m^{3}). Normal storage is 3,180 acre-feet (3,920,000 m^{3}). It drains an area of 24 square miles (62 km^{2}).

In 1928 a dam was constructed at West Charleston. In 1929 a dam was built at Pensioner's Pond.

In 1957 #11 Dam was constructed. It was located 1,000 feet (305 m) below the current hydro generation station off Clyde Street. In 1994 the #11 Dam was breached. In 1996 the #11 Dam was removed. In 2007 a fish (salmon) passage was built at the Newport Dam. Salmon fishing in Lake Memphremagog and the Clyde nearly stopped when the dam was constructed. It has improved since the dam's removal. The State of Vermont stocks the river with 30,000 salmon annually. 6,000 perish immediately from predators. Of those that make the journey to Lake Memphremagog, 18,000 return to spawn. The remainder assumed to be caught by fishermen.

== Lists ==
=== Tributaries ===
The following dams are on tributaries (watershed) that feed into the Clyde, and not the Clyde itself:

Lake Seymour is on a tributary which drains into Echo Lake, which in turn drains into the Clyde. It is not used for hydroelectric power. Construction of the original dam was completed in 1928. The lake has a normal surface area of 2.8 square miles (7.3 km^{2}). It is owned by Great Bay Hydro Corporation. This dam is stone, and concrete. The core is concrete. The foundation is soil. Its height is 7 feet (2.1 m) by 68 feet (21 m) long. Maximum discharge is 85 cubic feet (2.4 m^{3}) per second. The capacity is 5,200 acre-feet (6,400,000 m^{3}). Normal storage is 3,500 acre-feet (4,300,000 m^{3}). It drains an area of 20.1875 square miles (52.285 km^{2}).

=== List of cities and towns ===
In upstream order:

- Newport, Vermont
- Derby, Vermont
- Charleston, Vermont
  - West Charleston (village)
  - East Charleston (village)
- Brighton, Vermont
  - Island Pond, Vermont

== See also ==
Media related to Category:Clyde River at Wikimedia Commons

- Pherrins River, Vermont
- Lake Memphremagog
- List of rivers of Vermont

== References and external links ==
- Map of Clyde River
- "Basin 17:Lake Memphremagog Watershed Assessment Report". Vermont Agency of Natural Resources, Department of Environmental Conservation, Water Quality Division. March 2006. Archived from the original (PDF) on August 29, 2007.
