= John H. Boylan State Airport =

- IATA: none; ICAO: none; FAA LID: 5B1

Summary
- Airport type: Public
- Owner: State of Vermont
- Serves: Island Pond, Vermont
- Elevation AMSL: 1,194 ft (364 m)
- Coordinates: 44°47′24″N 071°49′35″W
- Website: vtrans.vermont.gov/aviation/airports/johnhboylan

Map
- Interactive map of John H. Boylan State Airport

Runways
| Direction | Length | | Surface |
| Direction | ft | m | Surface |
|---|---|---|---|
| 14/32 | 2,650 | 808 | Turf |

Statistics (2019)
- Aircraft operations (year ending 7/31/2019): 403
- Based aircraft: 5
- Source: Federal Aviation Administration

John H. Boylan State Airport (FAA LID: 5B1) is a state-owned public-use airport located three nautical miles (6 km) southeast of the central business district of Island Pond, in Essex County, Vermont, United States.

== Facilities and aircraft ==
The airport is named for John H. Boylan, a political figure who served as President pro tempore of the Vermont State Senate. It covers an area of 188 acres (76 ha) at an elevation of 1,194 feet (364 m) above mean sea level. It has one runway designated 14/32 with a turf surface measuring 2,650 by 120 feet (808 x 37 m).

For the 12-month period ending July 31, 2019, the airport had 403 general aviation aircraft operations, an average of 34 per month. At that time there were five aircraft based at this airport: 3 single-engine and 2 ultralight.

== See also ==
- List of airports in Vermont
