= Echo Lake (Charleston, Vermont) =

Lake in Orleans County, Vermont, US

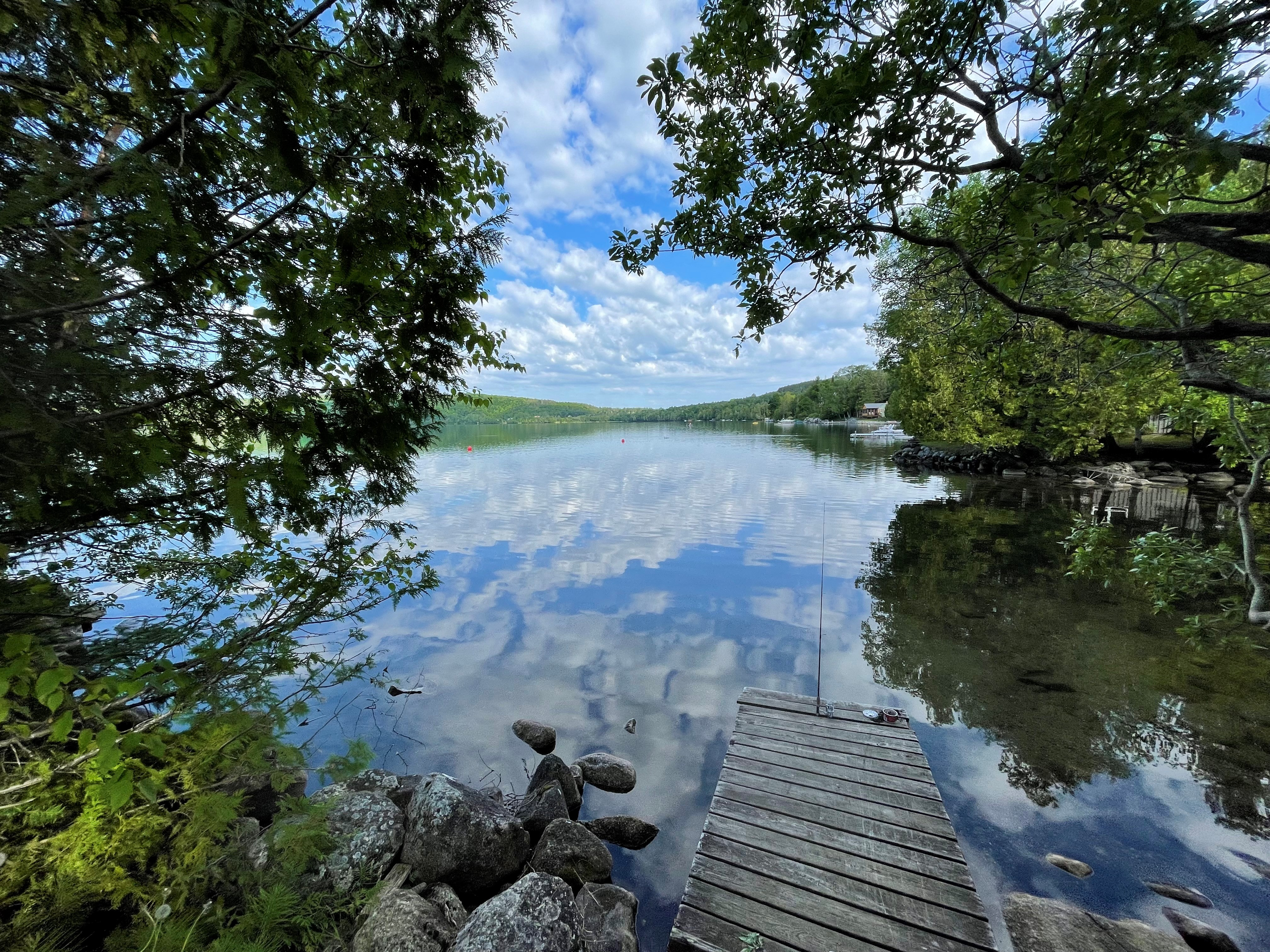
- A dock on the eastern shores of Echo Lake in June 2021

- Location within Vermont Location within the United States
- Location: Charleston, Vermont
- Coordinates: 44°51′40″N 71°59′40″W
- Primary outflows: Clyde River
- Basin countries: United States
- Max. length: 1.5 mi (2.4 km)
- Max. width: 0.75 mi (1.21 km)
- Surface area: 530 acres (2.1 km^{2})
- Max. depth: 129 ft (39 m)
- Surface elevation: 1,250 ft (381 m)

Echo Lake is located in the town of Charleston in Orleans County, Vermont, within a region known as the Northeast Kingdom. It is one of only two deep, cold, and oligotrophic lakes in the Clyde River system, the other being nearby Lake Seymour. The first Surveyor General of Vermont, Whitelaw, gave it the name of Echo Pond because when any sound was produced in its vicinity it was reverberated in various directions, producing a series of echoes.

The freshwater lake covers 530 acres (2.1 km^{2}) and is 1.5 miles (2.4 km) long and 0.75 miles (1.21 km) at its widest; its maximum depth is 129 feet (39 m). The lake is fed by the outlet from Lake Seymour. The lake empties into the Clyde River, Lake Memphremagog and, eventually, Canada's St. Lawrence River.

A dam is used for hydroelectric power. Construction was completed in 1922. It is owned by Citizens Utilities Company. The dam is concrete. The core is homogeneous concrete. The foundation is rock. The height is 16 feet (4.9 m) by 120 feet (37 m). Maximum discharge is 693 cubic feet (19.6 m^{3}) per second. Its capacity is 5,000 acre-feet (6,200,000 m^{3}). Normal storage is 3,180 acre-feet (3,920,000 m^{3}). It drains an area of 24 square miles (62 km^{2}). The dam was reconstructed in 1984.

The coldwater fishery at Echo Lake offers rainbow trout, brook trout and lake trout (both wild and stocked), as well as landlocked Atlantic salmon that have travelled from nearby Seymour Lake. Self-sustaining populations of other species present in the lake include smallmouth bass, yellow perch and burbot.
