= Seymour Lake (Vermont) =

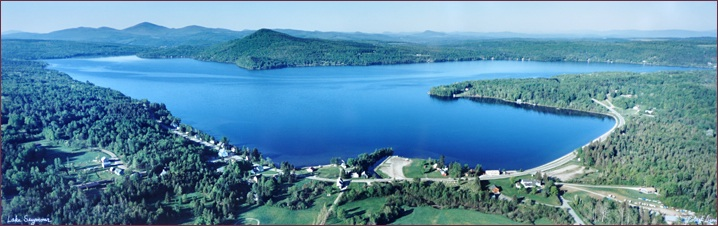
- Seymour Lake

- Location within Vermont Location within the United States

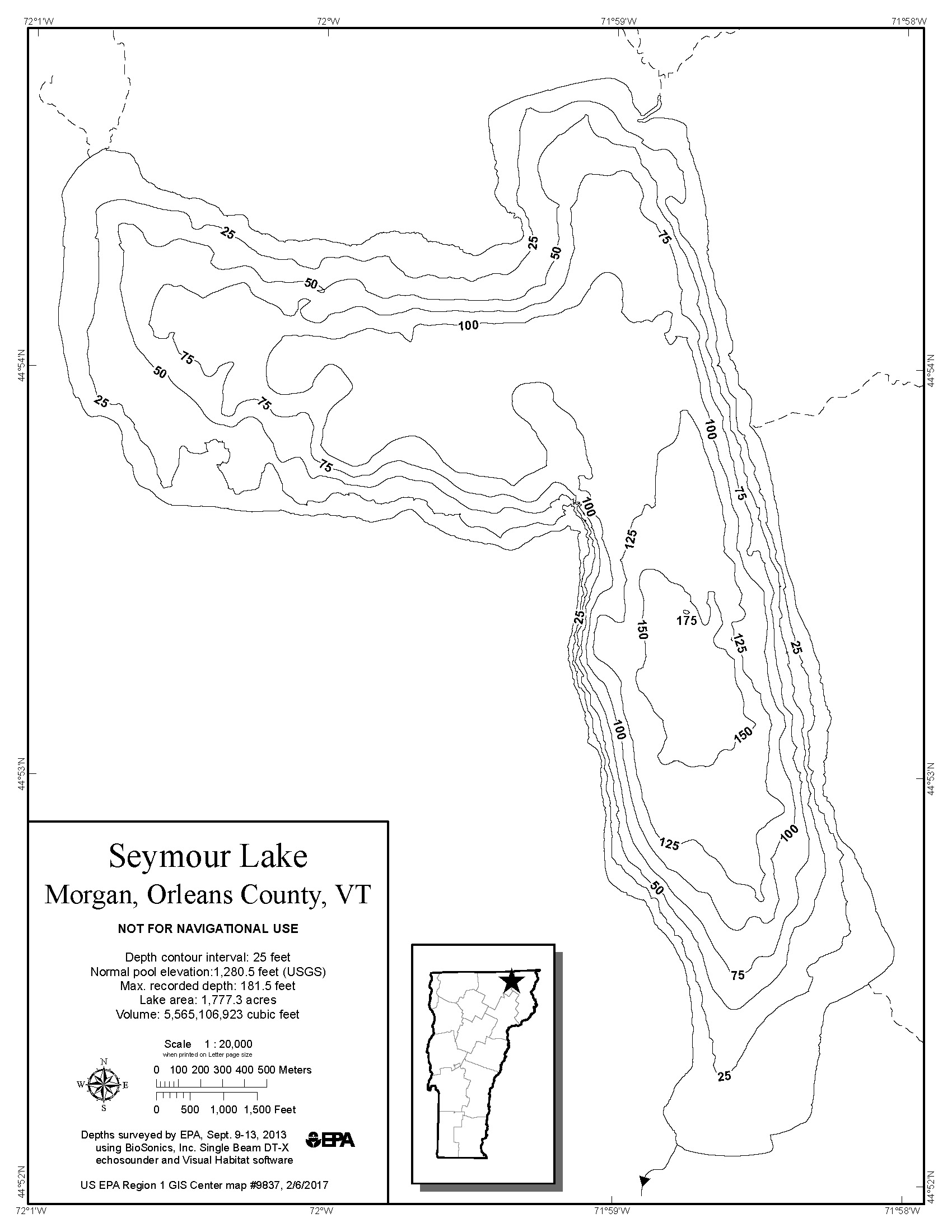
- A bathymetric map of the depths of Seymour Lake in Vermont, as measured September 9-13, 2013
- Location: Morgan, Orleans County, Vermont
- Coordinates: 44°53′49″N 071°58′54″W
- Lake type: Glacial lake, ice age
- Primary inflows: Outlet from Mud Pond, Sucker Brook
- Primary outflows: Clyde River
- Basin countries: United States
- Max. length: 3 mi (4.8 km)
- Max. width: 2 mi (3.2 km)
- Surface area: 1,732 acres (7.01 km^{2})
- Max. depth: 169 ft (52 m)
- Surface elevation: 1,278 ft (390 m)
- Settlements: Town of Morgan

Seymour Lake is located in the town of Morgan in Orleans County, Vermont, United States, an area known as the Northeast Kingdom. The lake was named for Israel Seymour, one of the original grantees. Natives called it Namagonic ("salmon trout spearing place"). The lake is on a tributary of the Clyde River in Orleans County, Vermont. It is one of only two deep, cold, and oligotrophic lakes in the Clyde River system, the other being nearby Echo Lake.

The closest major airport is located in Burlington, Vermont, located approximately 101 miles away.

== Dam ==
The Seymour Lake Dam is used for hydroelectric power. Construction on the dam was completed in 1928, and was rebuilt in 2004. It has a normal surface area of 2.8 square miles (7.3 km^{2}). It is owned by Citizens Utilities Company and is located in Charleston, Vermont.

The dam is made of stone with a concrete core. The foundation is soil. The height is 12 feet (3.7 m) with a length of 75 feet (23 m). Maximum discharge is 85 cubic feet (2.4 m^{3}) per second. Its capacity is 5,200 acre-feet (6,400,000 m^{3}). Normal storage is 5,200 acre-feet (6,400,000 m^{3}). It drains an area of 20.1875 square miles (52.285 km^{2}).

== Fishing ==
The lake is populated with bass, trout, perch and salmon. Ice fishing is popular on the lake in winter. Historically the lake had a population of rainbow smelt, which was absent as of 2021.

== Environmental protection ==
The Aquatic Invasive Species Prevention Program of Seymour Lake was founded in 1999 for the protection against of Eurasian water milfoil (Myriophyllum spicatum) and zebra mussels (Dreissena polymorpha), which have already infested many nearby lakes but have not been found in Seymour. Staffing is provided by greeters at the state fishing access, located in Morgan Center in the northeastern corner of the lake, to inspect watercraft from other water bodies, 7 days/week, 12 hours/day (13 on Saturdays) from Memorial Day until the end of fishing season (October 31), with a hot water Watercraft Decontamination Station Patrolers from the Vermont Invasive Patroller program examine the bottom of the lake for aquatic vegetation and identification of potential aquatic invasive species.

Phosphorus levels had been increasing in the lake, but are now kept stable.
