= East Charleston, Vermont =

- Village
- Location within Vermont
- Coordinates: 44°50′17″N 71°59′22″W
- Country: United States
- State: Vermont
- County: Orleans
- Elevation: 1,168 ft (356 m)
- Time zone: UTC-5 (Eastern (EST))
  - Summer (DST): UTC-4 (EDT)
- ZIP code: 05833
- Area code: 802
- GNIS feature ID: 1457268

East Charleston is an unincorporated village in the town of Charleston, Orleans County, Vermont, United States. The community is located along Vermont Route 105 12.6 miles (20.3 km) southeast of Newport. East Charleston has a post office with ZIP code 05833.
