= Island Pond, Vermont =

Census-designated place in Vermont, United States

- Census-designated place
- Island Pond, Vermont, from the northwest

- Location in Essex County and the state of Vermont
- Coordinates: 44°48′43″N 71°52′50″W
- Country: United States
- State: Vermont
- County: Essex
- Town: Brighton

Area
  - Total: 4.6 sq mi (11.8 km^{2})
  - Land: 4.2 sq mi (10.8 km^{2})
  - Water: 0.39 sq mi (1.0 km^{2})
- Elevation: 1,175 ft (358 m)

Population (2020)
  - Total: 750
  - Density: 180/sq mi (69/km^{2})
- Time zone: UTC-5 (EST)
  - Summer (DST): UTC-4 (EDT)
- ZIP code: 05846
- Area code: 802
- FIPS code: 50-35725
- GNIS feature ID: 2378128

Island Pond is a census-designated place (CDP) in the town of Brighton in Essex County, Vermont, United States. The population was 750 at the 2020 census. It is part of the Berlin, NH–VT Micropolitan Statistical Area.

== History ==
=== The railroad ===
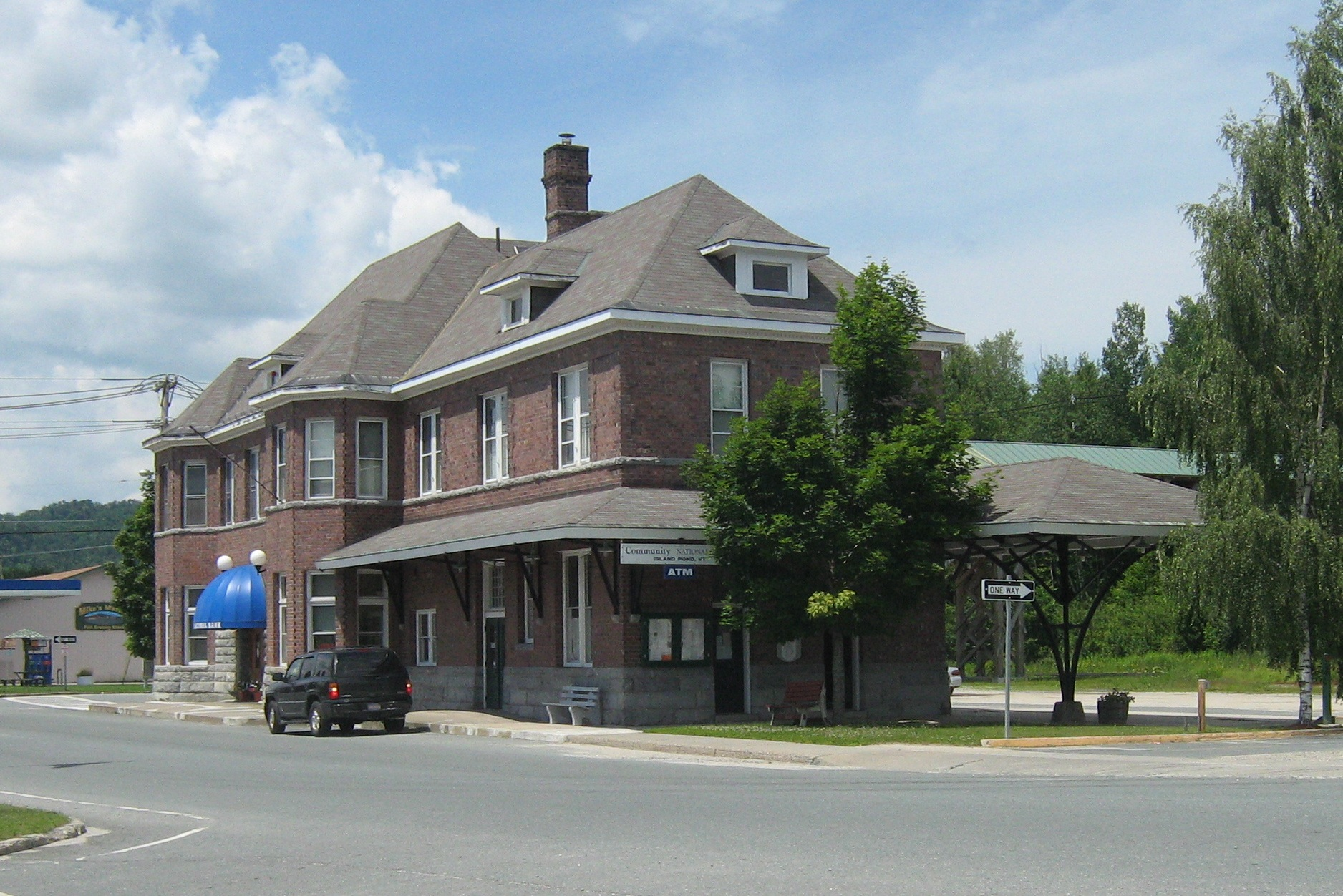
The former Grand Trunk Railroad station is now a bank branch and offices.

Island Pond became an important railroad center in 1853 when the Grand Trunk Railway established international connections between Montreal, Quebec, and Portland, Maine. The half-way point in the Portland–Montreal railroad line, this town became a booming railroad center with a roundhouse, shops, and all the facilities associated with train operations. In 1923, the Grand Trunk Railway of Canada was bankrupt and taken over by the Canadian government and operated as the Canadian National Railways. From 1931 until after World War II, the United States Border Patrol maintained a station in Island Pond.

With the Canadian government directing the railroad, political considerations soon outweighed the economics of the railroad; commerce was displaced from the port of Portland to the Canadian ports of Halifax and St. John. The importance of the Portland line then began a decline which was never to be reversed. Island Pond's days as a major railroad town were over by the late 1950s due to the elimination of steam locomotives. By 1960 passenger train service to Portland had ended, and three years later the diesel locomotive shop was closed. In 1966, barely a skeleton staff of people worked in Island Pond after the roundhouse closed. Canadian National continued to operate freight service to Portland until 1988; the following year, the line was sold to a short line operator, the St. Lawrence and Atlantic Railroad, which continues to provide service.

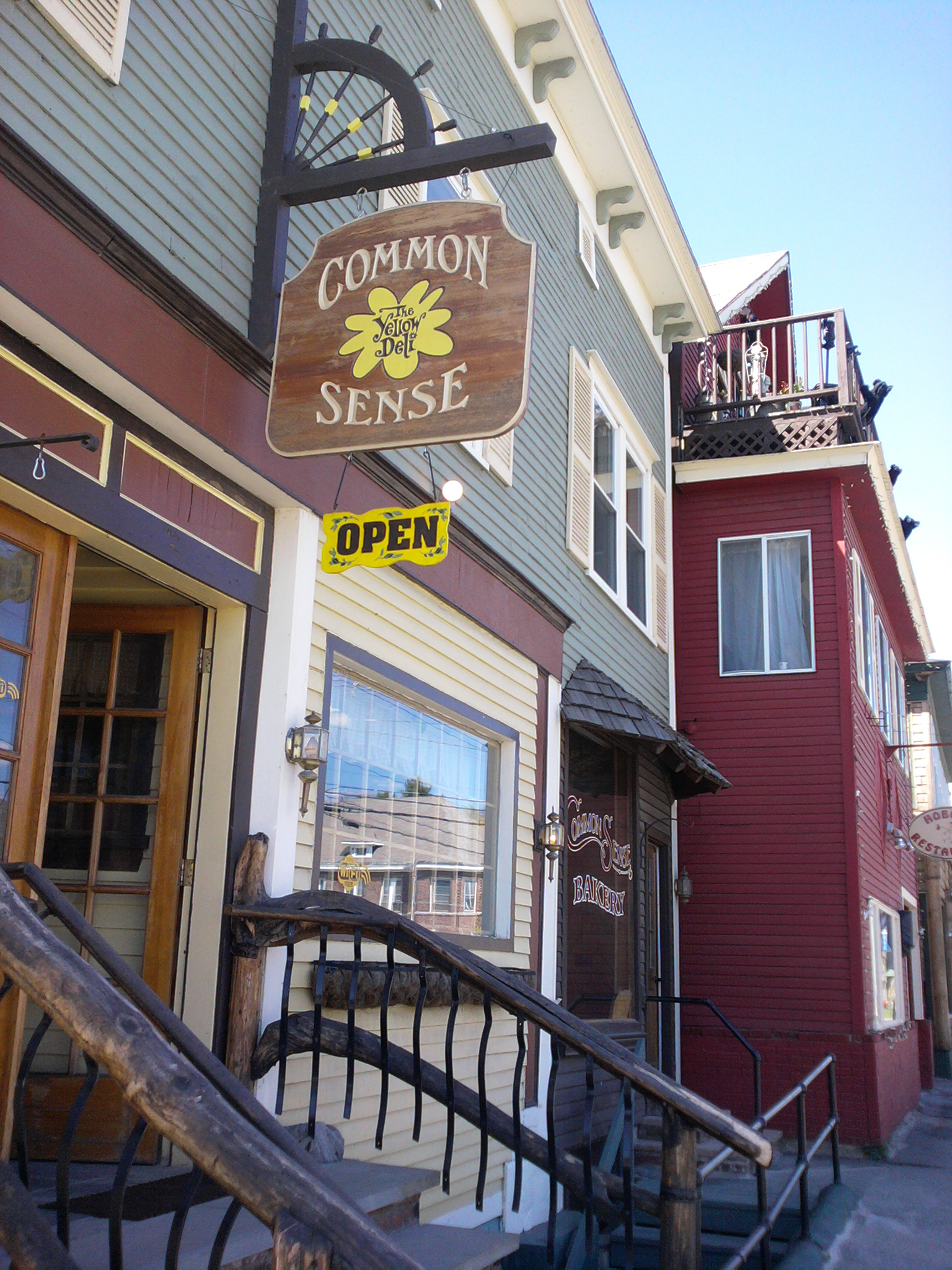
Common Sense Cafe at 28 Cross Street next door to Yellow Deli--both owned and operated by the Twelve Tribes.

=== The Twelve Tribes ===
Island Pond became the home of the Twelve Tribes when the religious movement relocated to Island Pond from Tennessee in 1977. The group, led by Yoneq Gene Spriggs, sought shelter from the opposition it met elsewhere, although it continually faced opposition which culminated in the Island Pond raid in 1984 where state police and state social workers seized 112 children due to allegations of child abuse. The children were returned the same day upon a determination that the raid was unconstitutional, and no trial was held on the evidence of abuse the state found. Nevertheless, the "Island Pond Raid" retains its notoriety.

=== Traffic enforcement ===
In 2007, Brighton Constable Theodore "Ted" Miller's strict enforcement of traffic regulations became the subject of nationwide coverage. In 2006 alone, 1,224 tickets and 1,662 warnings were issued.

== Geography ==
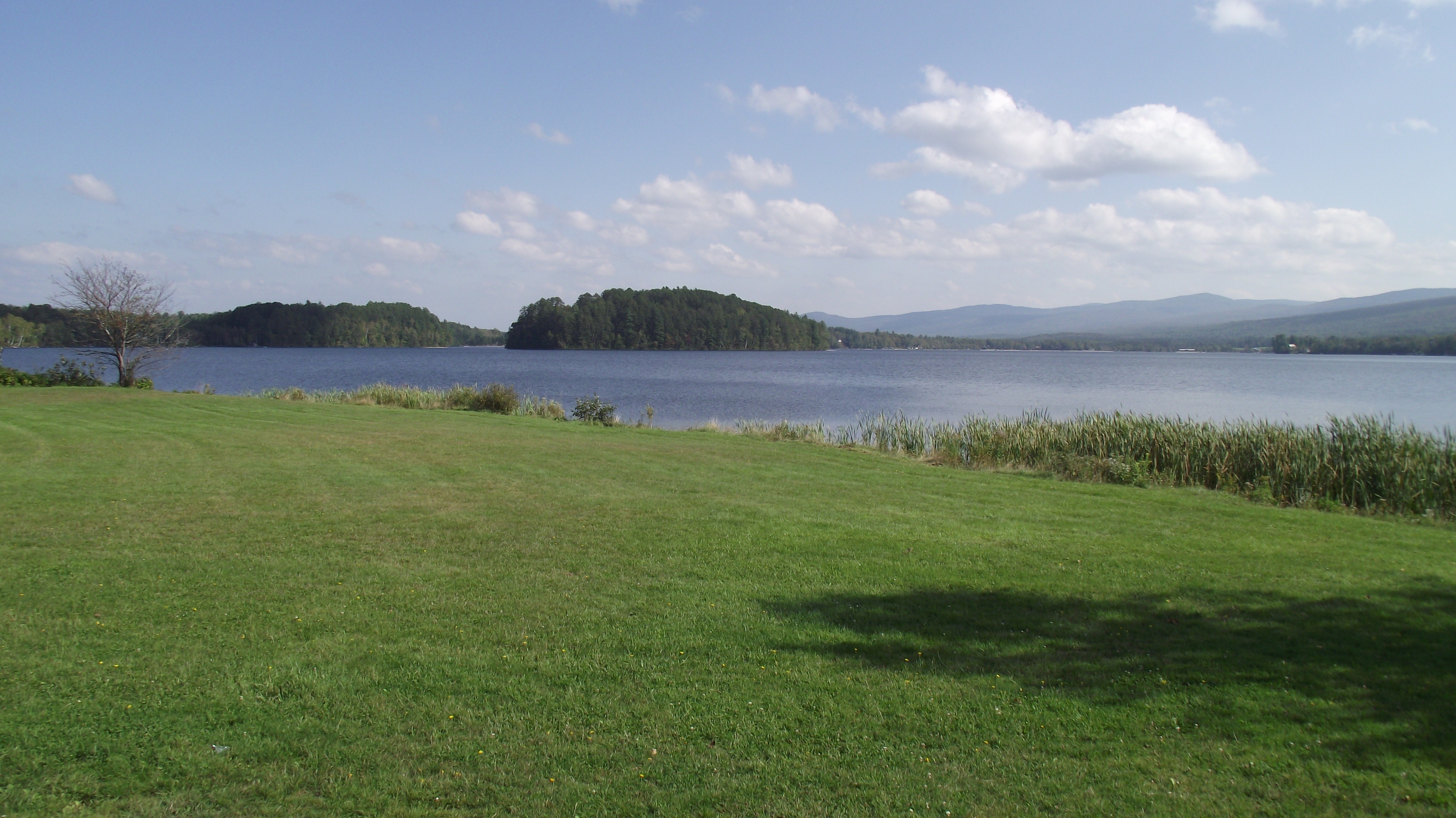
The Island in the Pond from which the village takes its name

Island Pond is in the center of the town of Brighton, at the north end (outlet) of Island Pond, the lake. Vermont Routes 114 and 105 pass through the community, joining as Derby Street leading south out of the center of the CDP. Route 114 leaves north from Island Pond as Railroad Street, leading 16 miles (26 km) to the Canada–United States border at Norton; to the south Route 114 leads 24 miles (39 km) to Lyndonville. Route 105 leaves east as East Brighton Road, leading 16 miles (26 km) to Bloomfield on the Connecticut River; to the southwest it follows Derby Street and Route 114 for 2 miles (3 km), then turns northwest and leads 17 miles (27 km) through Charleston to Derby Center.

According to the United States Census Bureau, the Island Pond CDP has a total area of 4.6 square miles (11.8 km^{2}), of which 4.2 square miles (10.8 km^{2}) is land and 0.39 square miles (1.0 km^{2}), or 8.42%, is water.

Bluff Mountain overlooks the lake and the island from the north.

The Clyde River flows west out of Island Pond after which the community is named. The Abenaki called this water Menanbawk (literally, "island pond"). It was renamed "Knowlton Pond" in tribute to Luke Knowlton, the surveyor who helped lay out the town in the 1780s. The river is a tributary of Lake Memphremagog and part of the St. Lawrence River basin.

=== Climate ===
According to the Köppen Climate Classification system, Island Pond has a warm-summer humid continental climate, abbreviated "Dfb" on climate maps. The hottest temperature recorded in Island Pond was 92 °F (33.3 °C) on July 2, 2026, while the coldest temperature recorded was −43 °F (−41.7 °C) on February 7, 1993.

Climate data for Island Pond, Vermont, 1991–2020 normals, extremes 1990–present
Month	Jan	Feb	Mar	Apr	May	Jun	Jul	Aug	Sep	Oct	Nov	Dec	Year
Record high °F (°C)	61 (16)	65 (18)	77 (25)	84 (29)	91 (33)	91 (33)	92 (33)	91 (33)	91 (33)	83 (28)	74 (23)	61 (16)	92 (33)
Mean maximum °F (°C)	46.5 (8.1)	48.0 (8.9)	56.3 (13.5)	72.0 (22.2)	81.4 (27.4)	86.2 (30.1)	86.8 (30.4)	85.1 (29.5)	81.9 (27.7)	72.8 (22.7)	62.1 (16.7)	49.6 (9.8)	88.7 (31.5)
Mean daily maximum °F (°C)	23.5 (−4.7)	26.6 (−3.0)	35.6 (2.0)	49.4 (9.7)	63.5 (17.5)	72.0 (22.2)	76.4 (24.7)	74.8 (23.8)	67.7 (19.8)	54.2 (12.3)	41.2 (5.1)	29.7 (−1.3)	51.2 (10.7)
Daily mean °F (°C)	13.5 (−10.3)	15.3 (−9.3)	24.9 (−3.9)	39.2 (4.0)	52.2 (11.2)	61.3 (16.3)	65.8 (18.8)	64.2 (17.9)	56.9 (13.8)	45.1 (7.3)	33.6 (0.9)	21.6 (−5.8)	41.1 (5.1)
Mean daily minimum °F (°C)	3.4 (−15.9)	4.0 (−15.6)	14.2 (−9.9)	28.9 (−1.7)	40.9 (4.9)	50.6 (10.3)	55.3 (12.9)	53.6 (12.0)	46.2 (7.9)	35.9 (2.2)	25.9 (−3.4)	13.5 (−10.3)	31.0 (−0.6)
Mean minimum °F (°C)	−25.9 (−32.2)	−23.0 (−30.6)	−16.3 (−26.8)	11.7 (−11.3)	26.3 (−3.2)	34.8 (1.6)	42.6 (5.9)	39.6 (4.2)	29.9 (−1.2)	21.2 (−6.0)	5.4 (−14.8)	−12.9 (−24.9)	−29.3 (−34.1)
Record low °F (°C)	−37 (−38)	−43 (−42)	−31 (−35)	−5 (−21)	21 (−6)	31 (−1)	32 (0)	35 (2)	23 (−5)	13 (−11)	−11 (−24)	−27 (−33)	−43 (−42)
Average precipitation inches (mm)	2.83 (72)	2.27 (58)	2.91 (74)	3.35 (85)	4.12 (105)	4.76 (121)	4.89 (124)	4.51 (115)	4.06 (103)	4.52 (115)	3.44 (87)	3.23 (82)	44.89 (1,141)
Average snowfall inches (cm)	25.3 (64)	26.1 (66)	22.1 (56)	5.7 (14)	0.4 (1.0)	0.0 (0.0)	0.0 (0.0)	0.0 (0.0)	0.0 (0.0)	1.4 (3.6)	8.8 (22)	25.1 (64)	114.9 (290.6)
Average extreme snow depth inches (cm)	21.0 (53)	27.1 (69)	26.4 (67)	9.0 (23)	0.3 (0.76)	0.0 (0.0)	0.0 (0.0)	0.0 (0.0)	0.0 (0.0)	1.0 (2.5)	5.1 (13)	13.5 (34)	30.8 (78)
Average precipitation days (≥ 0.01 in)	17.3	14.4	14.4	14.2	16.1	16.7	16.8	15.8	15.4	16.9	16.5	18.6	193.1
Average snowy days (≥ 0.1 in)	15.4	13.3	10.1	3.5	0.2	0.0	0.0	0.0	0.0	1.0	6.3	14.1	63.9
Source 1: NOAA
Source 2: National Weather Service

The weather station Island Pond AP is situated at John H. Boylan State Airport.

Climate data for Island Pond AP, Vermont, 1991–2020 normals: 1194ft (364m)
Month	Jan	Feb	Mar	Apr	May	Jun	Jul	Aug	Sep	Oct	Nov	Dec	Year
Mean daily maximum °F (°C)	25.1 (−3.8)	27.5 (−2.5)	36.0 (2.2)	49.9 (9.9)	64.0 (17.8)	71.8 (22.1)	76.7 (24.8)	75.6 (24.2)	68.2 (20.1)	54.8 (12.7)	41.0 (5.0)	29.8 (−1.2)	51.7 (10.9)
Daily mean °F (°C)	12.0 (−11.1)	12.4 (−10.9)	21.9 (−5.6)	38.4 (3.6)	52.0 (11.1)	60.0 (15.6)	65.3 (18.5)	63.5 (17.5)	55.9 (13.3)	43.4 (6.3)	31.4 (−0.3)	19.6 (−6.9)	39.7 (4.3)
Mean daily minimum °F (°C)	−1.1 (−18.4)	−2.8 (−19.3)	7.8 (−13.4)	26.9 (−2.8)	39.9 (4.4)	48.1 (8.9)	53.8 (12.1)	51.4 (10.8)	43.5 (6.4)	32.0 (0.0)	21.8 (−5.7)	9.4 (−12.6)	27.6 (−2.5)
Source: NOAA

=== Fauna ===
A 2010 Christmas bird count found 28 species.

== Demographics ==
As of the census of 2000, there were 849 people, 374 households, and 228 families residing in the CDP. The population density was 203/mi^{2} (78.4/km^{2}). There were 556 housing units at an average density of 132.9/mi^{2} (51.4/km^{2}).

There were 374 households, out of which 28.3% had children under the age of 18 living with them, 44.4% were married couples living together, 13.4% had a female householder with no husband present, and 38.8% were non-families. 32.6% of all households were made up of individuals, and 19.0% had someone living alone who was 65 years of age or older. The average household size was 2.27 and the average family size was 2.88.

In the CDP, the population was spread out, with 24.0% under the age of 18, 8.7% from 18 to 24, 22.6% from 25 to 44, 25.3% from 45 to 64, and 19.3% who were 65 years of age or older. The median age was 42 years. For every 100 females, there were 94.3 males. For every 100 females age 18 and over, there were 89.1 males.

The median income for a household in the CDP was $25,547, and the median income for a family was $31,250. Males had a median income of $25,577 versus $23,542 for females. The per capita income for the CDP was $13,207. Nearly 15% of families and 19.4% of the population were below the poverty line, including 28.8% of those under age 18 and 18% of those age 65 or over.

== Government ==
=== Social services ===
Social services are provided in part by the Northeast Kingdom Community Action located here and in other Northeast Kingdom sites.

== Infrastructure ==
=== Transportation ===
Island Pond is served by Vermont Routes 105 and 114. The St. Lawrence and Atlantic Railroad passes through the village. John H. Boylan State Airport is located east of the village on Route 105.

== Media ==
WVTI 106.9 broadcasts from Island Pond.

The town was the setting of the memoir A Dresser of Sycamore Trees by Garret Keizer. The town was also the subject of two historical non-fiction books by author Sharon Biron, Island Pond Reflections and Island Pond Insights.

== Notable people ==
- Harry B. Amey, United States Attorney for Vermont
- John H. Boylan, President pro tempore of the Vermont State Senate
- George N. Dale, Lieutenant Governor of Vermont
- Porter H. Dale, U.S. congressman and senator
- Zophar M. Mansur, Lieutenant Governor of Vermont
- Rudy Vallée, singer, actor, bandleader, and entertainer
