= West Charleston, Vermont =

- Village
- Location within Vermont
- Coordinates: 44°53′56″N 72°03′34″W
- Country: United States
- State: Vermont
- County: Orleans
- Elevation: 1,007 ft (307 m)
- Time zone: UTC-5 (Eastern (EST))
  - Summer (DST): UTC-4 (EDT)
- ZIP code: 05872
- Area code: 802
- GNIS feature ID: 1460126

West Charleston is an unincorporated village in the town of Charleston, Orleans County, Vermont, United States. The community is located along Vermont Route 5A and Vermont Route 105 5 miles (8.0 km) southeast of Derby Center. West Charleston has a post office with ZIP code 05872.

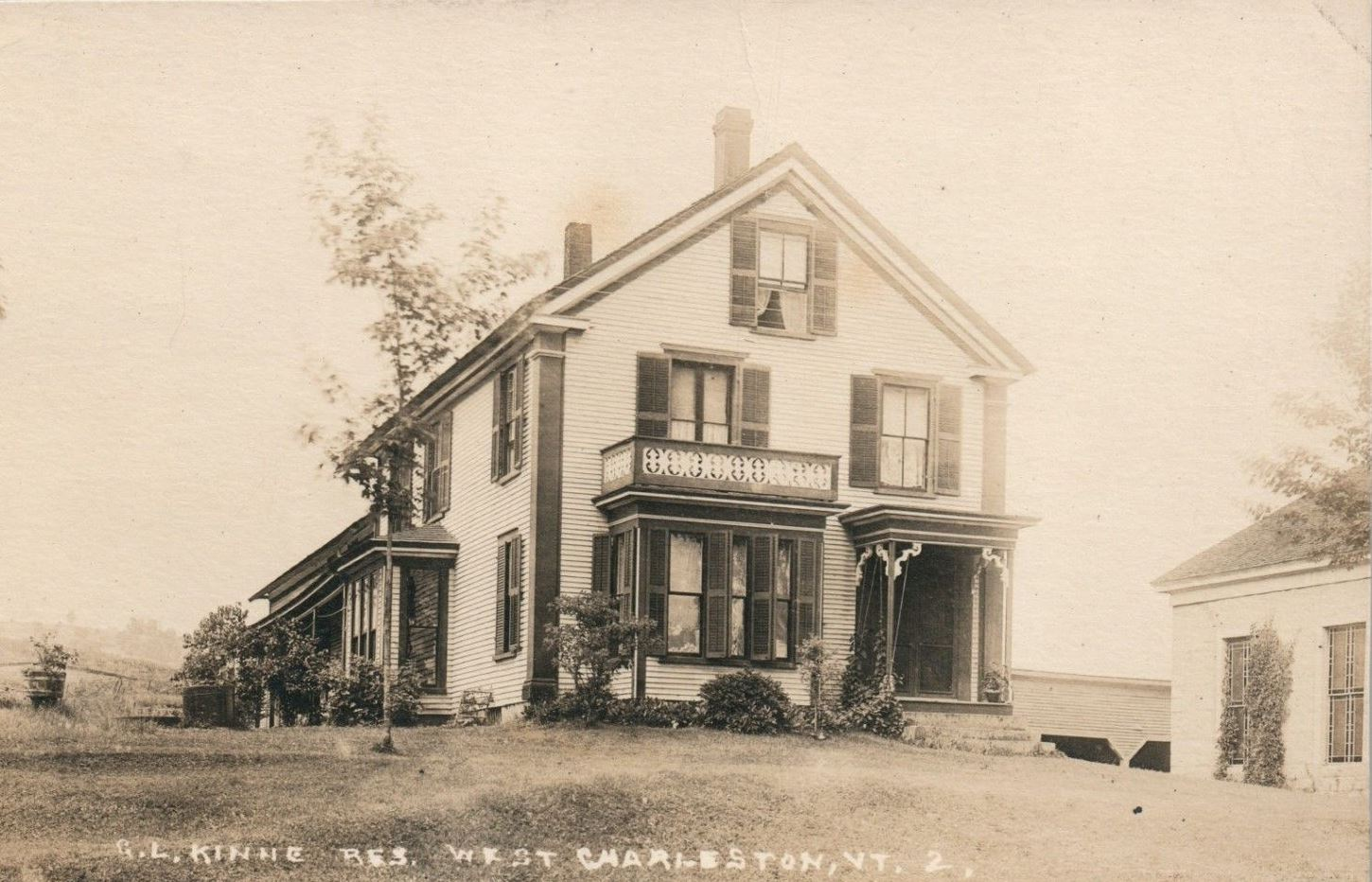
The G.L. Kinne House of West Charleston, Vermont was shown on this postcard dated October 1920.
