= Sheffield (CDP), Vermont =

Census-designated place in Vermont, United States

Sheffield, Vermont
- Census-designated place
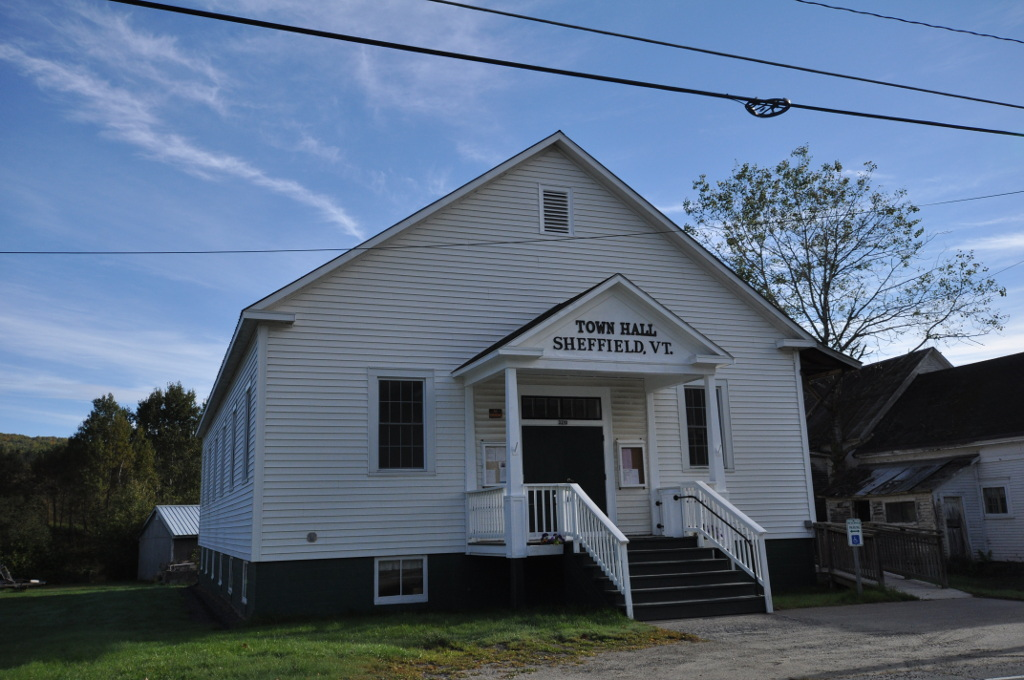
- Sheffield Town Hall

- Location within Vermont Location within the United States
- Coordinates: 44°35′55″N 72°07′18″W
- Country: United States
- State: Vermont
- County: Caledonia
- Town: Sheffield

Area
  - Total: 0.65 sq mi (1.68 km^{2})
  - Land: 0.64 sq mi (1.67 km^{2})
  - Water: 0.0077 sq mi (0.02 km^{2})
- Elevation: 919 ft (280 m)
- Time zone: UTC-5 (Eastern (EST))
  - Summer (DST): UTC-4 (EDT)
- ZIP Code: 05866
- Area code: 802
- FIPS code: 50-64000
- GNIS feature ID: 2805707

Sheffield is the primary village and a census-designated place (CDP) in the town of Sheffield, Caledonia County, Vermont, United States. It was first listed as a CDP prior to the 2020 census.

== Geography ==
The village is in northern Caledonia County, along the southern edge of the town of Sheffield. It is bordered to the south by the town of Wheelock. The village sits in the valley of Miller Run, a southeast-flowing tributary of the Passumpsic River and part of the Connecticut River watershed.

Vermont Route 122 runs through the center of the village, leading northwest 12 miles (19 km) to Barton and southeast 7 miles (11 km) to Lyndonville. Interstate 91 runs along the northeast edge of the CDP, but with no direct access, the closest interchange being Exit 24 (VT 122) in Lyndon Center, 5 miles (8 km) to the southeast.
