= Vermont Route 122 =

State highway in Vermont, US

Vermont Route 122
- VT 122 highlighted in red

Route information
- Maintained by VTrans
- Length: 15.215 mi (24.486 km)

Major junctions
- South end: US 5 / VT 114 in Lyndon
- I-91 in Lyndon
- North end: VT 16 in Glover

Location
- Country: United States
- State: Vermont
- Counties: Caledonia, Orleans

Highway system
- State highways in Vermont
| ← VT 121 | → VT 123 |

Vermont Route 122 (VT 122) is a state highway in the U.S. state of Vermont. The highway runs 15.215 miles (24.486 km) from U.S. Route 5 (US 5) and VT 114 in Lyndon north to VT 16 in Glover. VT 122 connects Lynch and the towns of Wheelock and Sheffield in Caledonia County with Glover in Orleans County. The highway has an alternate route in Lyndon that provides access to Lyndon State College.

== Route description ==
VT 122 begins at a four-legged intersection with US 5 and VT 114 (East Burke Road) just north of the incorporated village of Lyndonville in the town of Lyndon; the U.S. Highway heads north as Lynburke Road and south across the Passumpsic River into the village on Main Street. The two-lane state highway heads west on Stevens Loop, which passes north of the confluence of the river and Miller Run, and meets the north end of VT 122 Alternate (Center Street) and Pudding Hill Road, which leads to Caledonia County Airport. VT 122 continues northwest along Miller Run on Gilman Road, which has a four-ramp partial cloverleaf interchange with Interstate 91. The highway crosses Squabble Hollow Brook and enters the town of Wheelock. VT 122 crosses Mathewson Brook and twice crosses a bend of Miller Run and passes through the Wheelock Common Historic District. The highway enters Sheffield and crosses Miller Run in the town's main village. VT 122 crosses Square Brook, Oregon Brook, Nation Brook, and Trout Brook; the highway follows the last stream to its source at Sheffield Heights. As the route descends from the mountain, it crosses the Caledonia–Orleans county line into the town of Glover and reaches its terminus at VT 16 (Dry Pond Road) in the valley of the Barton River.

== Major intersections ==
| County | Location | mi | km | Destinations | Notes |
|---|---|---|---|---|---|
| Caledonia | Lyndon | 0.000 | 0.000 | US 5 (Lynburke Road/Main Street) / VT 114 north (East Burke Road) – Lyndonville, West Burke, Barton | Southern terminus |
| Caledonia | Lyndon | 0.563 | 0.906 | VT 122 Alt. south (Center Street) – Lyndon State College | Northern terminus of VT 122 Alt. |
| Caledonia | Lyndon | 1.733– 2.059 | 2.789– 3.314 | I-91 – Barton, Newport, St. Johnsbury | I-91 exit 24; partial cloverleaf interchange |
| Orleans | Glover | 15.215 | 24.486 | VT 16 – Glover, Barton, Greensboro | Northern terminus |
1.000 mi = 1.609 km; 1.000 km = 0.621 mi

== Alternate route ==
Vermont Route 122 Alternate
- Location: Lyndon
- Length: 1.042 mi (1.677 km)

Vermont Route 122 Alternate (VT 122 Alternate) was unsigned. Signed at the north end and inconsistently throughout as ALT 122, it is a town-maintained, 1.042-mile-long (1.677 km) alternate route of VT 122 that runs from US 5 north to VT 122 within Lyndon. The two-lane highway, which is named Center Street, begins at US 5 (Broad Street) in the incorporated village of Lyndonville in the town of Lyndon. VT 122 Alternate heads west and crosses the Passumpsic River, then curves north into the village of Lyndon Center. There, the highway intersects College Road, which leads to the Lyndon Institute and Lyndon State College. The alternate route continues north past the historic District 6 School House and crosses the Bradley Covered Bridge over Miller Run just west of the stream's confluence with the Passumpsic River and just south of its terminus at VT 122 (Gilman Road).

Major intersections

The entire route is in Lyndon, Caledonia County.

| mi | km | Destinations | Notes |
|---|---|---|---|
| 0.000 | 0.000 | US 5 | Southern terminus |
| 1.042 | 1.677 | VT 122 (Gilman Road) | Northern terminus |
1.000 mi = 1.609 km; 1.000 km = 0.621 mi
