= Passumpsic =

Passumpsic is a Native American word meaning "clear running water" and may refer to:

== Geography ==
- The Passumpsic River, a tributary of the Connecticut River in Vermont

== Ships ==
- USS Passumpsic (AO-107), an oiler that served in the United States Navy from 1946 to 1973 before transferring to the Military Sealift Command and becoming USNS Passumpsic (T-AO-107)
- USNS Passumpsic (T-AO-107), an oiler that served in the Military Sealift Command from 1973 to 1991 after service in the United States Navy as USS Passumpsic (AO-107)
