= Lyndon (CDP), Vermont =

Census-designated place in Vermont, United States

Lyndon, Vermont Lyndon Corner
- Census-designated place
- Location within Vermont Location within the United States
- Coordinates: 44°30′54″N 72°00′50″W
- Country: United States
- State: Vermont
- County: Caledonia
- Town: Lyndon

Area
  - Total: 0.24 sq mi (0.62 km^{2})
  - Land: 0.24 sq mi (0.62 km^{2})
  - Water: 0 sq mi (0.0 km^{2})
- Elevation: 709 ft (216 m)

Population (2020)
  - Total: 203
  - Density: 848/sq mi (327.4/km^{2})
- Time zone: UTC-5 (Eastern (EST))
  - Summer (DST): UTC-4 (EDT)
- ZIP Code: 05851 (Lyndonville)
- Area code: 802
- FIPS code: 50-41650
- GNIS feature ID: 2805703

Lyndon is a census-designated place (CDP) in the town of Lyndon, Caledonia County, Vermont, United States, corresponding to the unincorporated village originally known as Lyndon Corner. The community was first listed as a CDP prior to the 2020 census, at which it had a population of 203.

== Geography ==
The village is in northern Caledonia County, in the southern part of the town of Lyndon. It occupies the valley of the South Wheelock Branch, an east-flowing tributary of the Passumpsic River and part of the Connecticut River watershed. U.S. Route 5 (Memorial Drive) passes through the east side of the village, and Interstate 91 forms the CDP's eastern edge. The two highways intersect at I-91's Exit 23 at the northeast corner of the village. US-5 leads north across the Passumpsic River 1 mile (1.6 km) into Lyndonville, the largest village in the town of Lyndon, and south 7 miles (11 km) to St. Johnsbury, while I-91 leads north 35 miles (56 km) to Newport and south past St. Johnsbury 66 miles (106 km) to White River Junction.
