= Sutton River =

Sutton River may refer to:

- Sutton River (Hudson Bay), Kenora District, Ontario, Canada
- Sutton River (Missisquoi River tributary), also known as the North Branch Missisquoi River, flowing in Vermont, United States, and Québec, Canada
- Sutton River (West Branch Passumpsic River tributary), in Caledonia County, Vermont, United States
