= Bradley Covered Bridge =

- U.S. National Register of Historic Places
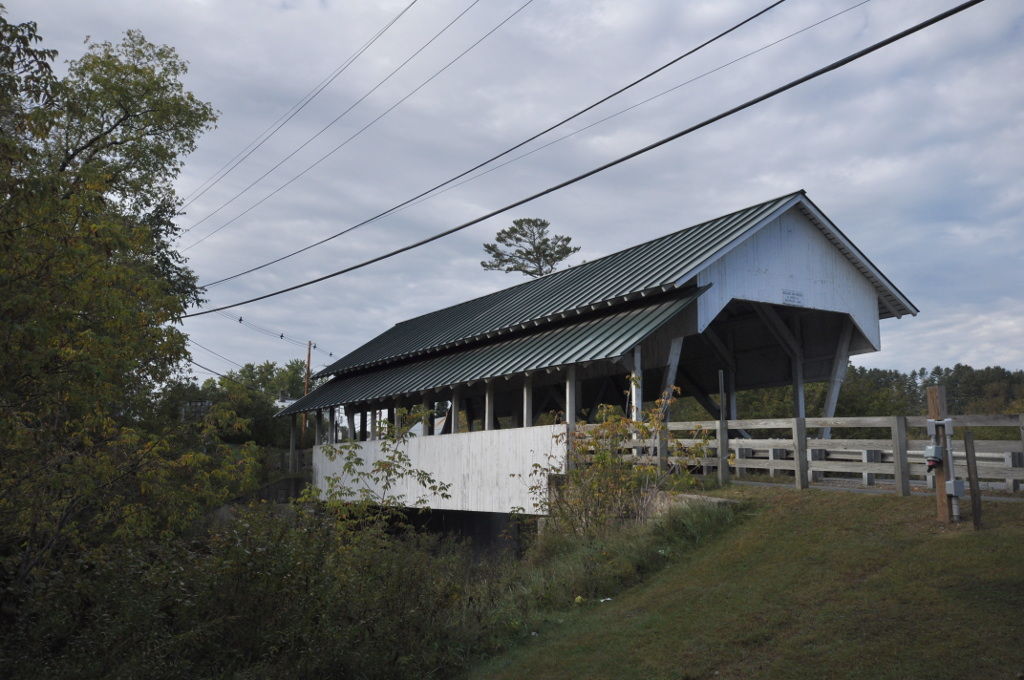

- Location within Vermont Location within the United States
- Location: Center St., Lyndon, Vermont
- Coordinates: 44°32′31″N 72°0′38″W
- Area: 1 acre (0.40 ha)
- Built: 1878
- Built by: Stone, E. H.
- Architectural style: queenpost truss
- NRHP reference No.: 77000096
- Added to NRHP: June 13, 1977

The Bradley Covered Bridge, also known as the Miller's Run Covered Bridge, is a historic covered bridge, carrying Center Street over Miller Run, a tributary of the Passumpsic River, in Lyndon, Vermont. Built in 1878, it is the last of Vermont's many 19th-century covered bridges to carry a numbered state highway (first Vermont Route 122 then later Vermont Route 122 Alternate). The bridge was listed on the National Register of Historic Places in 1977.

== Description and history ==
The Bradley Covered Bridge is located north of central Lyndon, crossing Miller Run on Central Street just south of its junction with Gilman Road. The latter carries Vermont Route 122 on the north side of Miller Run, while Central Street runs south to the downtown area. The bridge is a single-span queenpost truss design, 56.5 feet (17.2 m) long and 17.5 feet (5.3 m) wide, with a roadway width of 15 feet (4.6 m). It is covered by a metal roof, and rests on abutments either faced or built out of concrete. Its sides are sheathed for half their height by vertical board siding. A sidewalk has been cantilevered out to the bridge's east side; it is sheltered by a shed roof offset main roof. The bridge's decking consists of wood planking.

The bridge was built in 1878 by E.H. Stone. It is similar in construction to five other area bridges, whose shared characteristics include extended eaves, half-wall siding, and portals with diagonal corners. In 1973, the bridge was crossed by an overheight truck, doing substantial damage to its south portal. The bridge has since then undergone restoration and was renovated in 1995.

== See also ==
- List of covered bridges in Vermont
- National Register of Historic Places listings in Caledonia County, Vermont
- List of bridges on the National Register of Historic Places in Vermont
