= St. Johnsbury (CDP), Vermont =

Census-designated place in Vermont, United States

St. Johnsbury, Vermont
- Census-designated place
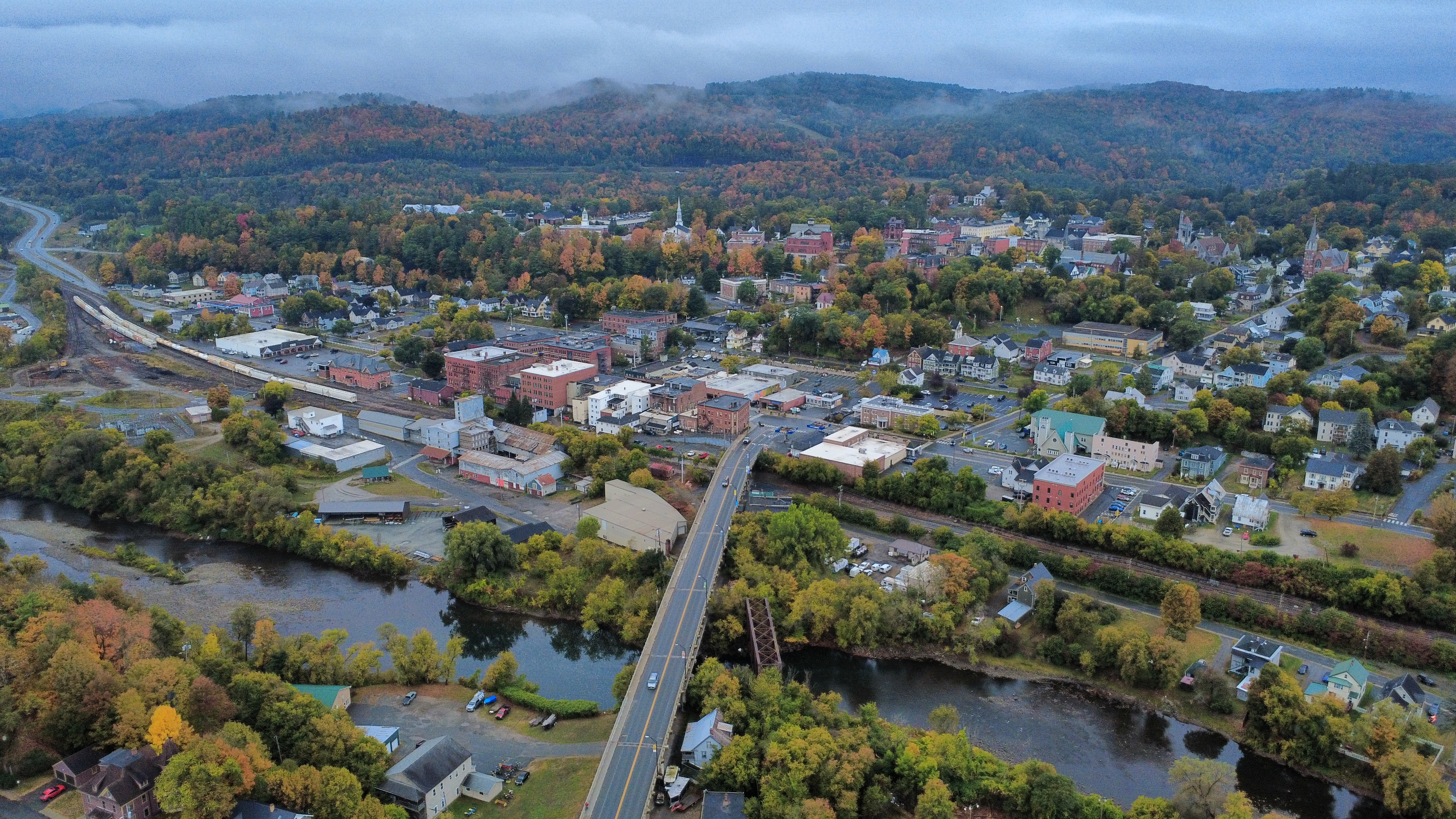
- St. Johnsbury, VT, from the northeast

- Location within Vermont Location within the United States
- Coordinates: 44°25′54″N 71°59′50″W
- Country: United States
- State: Vermont
- County: Caledonia
- Town: St. Johnsbury

Area
  - Total: 13.1 sq mi (33.8 km^{2})
  - Land: 12.8 sq mi (33.2 km^{2})
  - Water: 0.23 sq mi (0.6 km^{2})
- Elevation: 656 ft (200 m)

Population (2020)
  - Total: 5,994
- Time zone: UTC-5 (Eastern (EST))
  - Summer (DST): UTC-4 (EDT)
- ZIP Code: 05819
- Area code: 802
- FIPS code: 50-62125
- GNIS feature ID: 2378133

St. Johnsbury or Saint Johnsbury is a census-designated place (CDP) corresponding to the main settled areas in the town of St. Johnsbury, Caledonia County, Vermont, United States. As of the 2020 census it had a population of 5,994, out of 7,364 in the entire town.

== Geography ==
The CDP is in eastern Caledonia County, occupying the southern one-third of the town of St. Johnsbury. It includes the urban center of St. Johnsbury, the village of St. Johnsbury Center to the north up the valley of the Passumpsic River, and development along Route 2 to the east up the valley of the Moose River, but not as far as the village of East St. Johnsbury.

Interstate 91 passes through the west side of the CDP, with access from Exits 20, 21, and 22. I-91 leads north 42 miles (68 km) to Newport and south 59 miles (95 km) to White River. U.S. Routes 2 and 5 intersect in the center of the community. U.S. 2 leads west 35 miles (56 km) to Montpelier, the state capital, and east 28 miles (45 km) to Lancaster, New Hampshire, while U.S. 5 provides a local parallel route to I-91, leading north 8 miles (13 km) to Lyndonville and south 20 miles (32 km) to Wells River.
