= Wheelock Common Historic District =

Historic district in Vermont, United States

- U.S. National Register of Historic Places
- U.S. Historic district
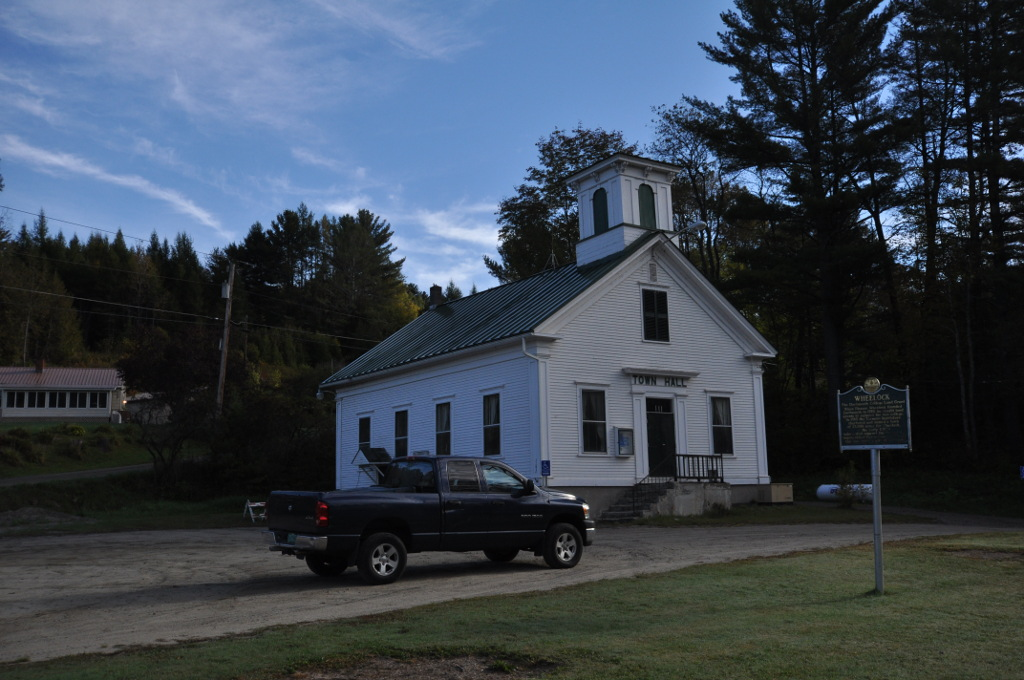

- Location within Vermont Location within the United States
- Location: VT 122, and town hwy 17, Wheelock, Vermont
- Coordinates: 44°35′16″N 72°4′59″W
- Area: 2 acres (0.81 ha)
- Built: 1827
- Architectural style: Greek Revival, Italianate
- NRHP reference No.: 07000894
- Added to NRHP: August 30, 2007

The Wheelock Common Historic District encompasses the traditional town center of the small northeastern Vermont community of Wheelock. Located at the junction of Vermont Route 122 and Sutton Road, it includes the town common, town hall, and cemetery. The district was listed on the National Register of Historic Places in 2007.

== Description and history ==
The village center of the town of Wheelock is located in its northeastern corner, stretching along Vermont Route 122 south of the Miller's Run river. At the eastern end of the linear village, Sutton Road (Town Highway 17) branches northeast, while Route 122 bends more southeast to follow the river. The town common is a quarter-acre grassy area on the east side of this junction; it is a roughly semicircular area bounded on the south by Route 122 and the north by the drive providing access to the town hall. It is shaded by pine trees, and has two benches, a bandstand, and the town's 1915 memorial to its American Civil War participants. Across Route 122 from the common is the cemetery, about 3/4 acre in size, also shaded by pine trees. The earliest dated grave is from 1827, although two people who died earlier have since been reinterred there. The town hall stands north of the common; it is a 1-1/2 story Greek Revival gable-roofed building with a square belfry.

The town of Wheelock was chartered in 1785 as a land grant to Dartmouth College and the Moor's Indian Charity School, both founded by Eleazer Wheelock, for whom the town is named. The town was managed for many years as a tenancy by Dartmouth, a relationship that did not fully end until the 1970s, when the college divested itself of all remaining land in the town. Its original town hall was located in the Wheelock Hollow area in the south of the town, but the cemetery was established in the village by 1827, and formally deeded to the town in 1860. The move to build a new town hall in the village in 1871 was spurred at least in part by an attempt to develop local mineral springs as a tourist draw. The Baptist church was moved to stand next to it in 1880, and a schoolhouse was also located facing the common. Both of these buildings were demolished in the 20th century due to deteriorating condition. The town hall, also deteriorating, was moved onto a new foundation in the 1970s, providing space for the town offices in the basement.

== See also ==
- National Register of Historic Places listings in Caledonia County, Vermont
