= Sutton (CDP), Vermont =

Census-designated place in Vermont, United States

Sutton, Vermont
- Census-designated place
- Location within Vermont Location within the United States
- Coordinates: 44°37′28″N 72°01′36″W
- Country: United States
- State: Vermont
- County: Caledonia
- Town: Sutton

Area
  - Total: 1.78 sq mi (4.61 km^{2})
  - Land: 1.78 sq mi (4.61 km^{2})
  - Water: 0 sq mi (0.0 km^{2})
- Elevation: 1,175 ft (358 m)
- Time zone: UTC-5 (Eastern (EST))
  - Summer (DST): UTC-4 (EDT)
- ZIP Code: 05867
- Area code: 802
- FIPS code: 50-71500
- GNIS feature ID: 2805710

Sutton is the primary village and a census-designated place (CDP) in the town of Sutton, Caledonia County, Vermont, United States. It was first listed as a CDP prior to the 2020 census.

== Geogeaphy ==
The village is in northern Caledonia County, in the southern part of the town of Sutton. It sits on a hillside draining southward to Calendar Brook, a southeast-flowing tributary of the West Branch of the Passumpsic River, part of the Connecticut River watershed.

The village is 1.8 miles (2.9 km) south of U.S. Route 5 at the locale known as Sutton Station, and it is 8 miles (13 km) north of Lyndonville.
