= Sutton River (West Branch Passumpsic River tributary) =

Location
- Country: United States
- State: Vermont

Physical characteristics
- Source: Marl Pond
  - location: Vermont
  - coordinates: 44.699°N 72.058°W
- Mouth: West Branch Passumpsic River
  - location: West Burke, Vermont
  - coordinates: 44.642°N 71.979°W

Basin features
- Tributaries
  - left: (Upstream)
  - right: (Upstream)

The Sutton River is a tributary of the West Branch Passumpsic River, flowing through Burke, Vermont, in Caledonia County, in Vermont.

== Course ==
The river arises in a Marl Pond, a forested area. It flows southeast through a little forested valley in Vermont, along a railroad and U.S. Route 5(Lynburke Road), up to West Burke.

== See also ==
- List of rivers of Vermont
