= Sheffield, Vermont =

- Town
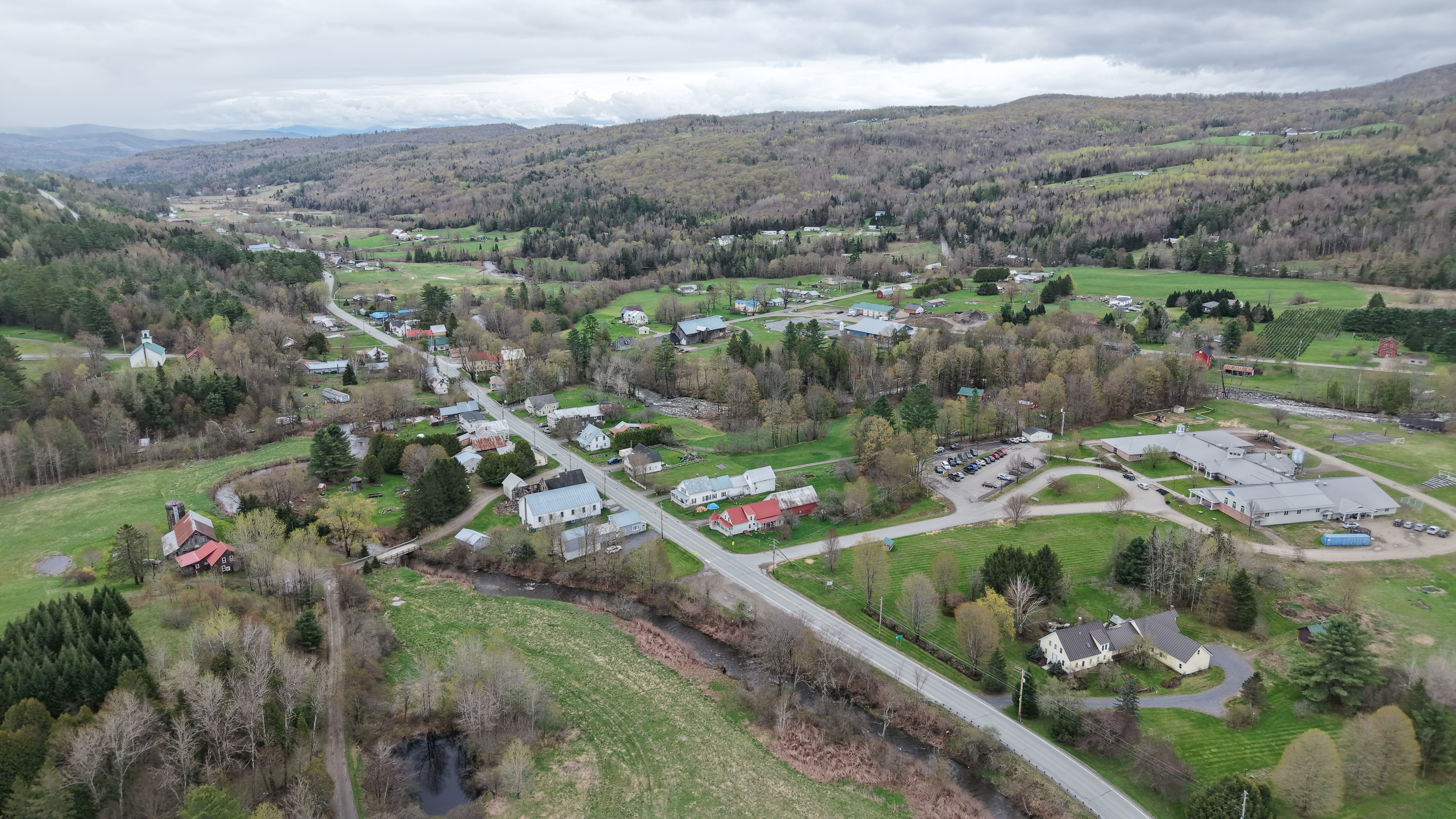
- Sheffield, Vermont, from the north

- Seal

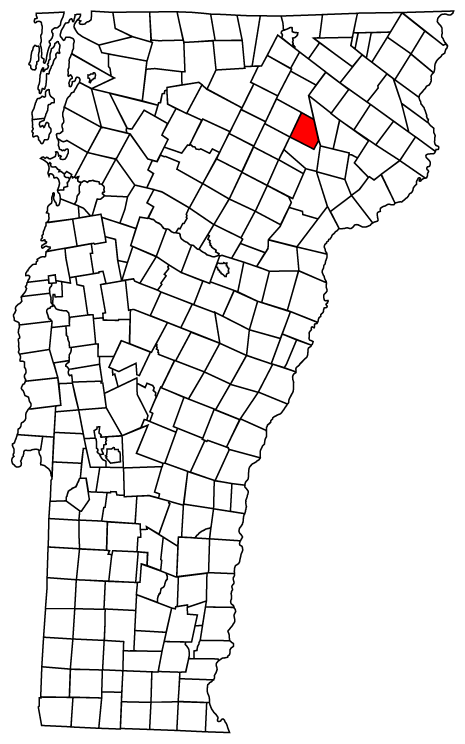
- Sheffield, Vermont
- Coordinates: 44°38′20″N 72°07′34″W
- Country: United States
- State: Vermont
- County: Caledonia
- Chartered: October 25, 1793

Area
  - Total: 32.8 sq mi (84.9 km^{2})
  - Land: 32.5 sq mi (84.2 km^{2})
  - Water: 0.27 sq mi (0.7 km^{2})
- Elevation: 1,480 ft (450 m)

Population (2020)
  - Total: 682
  - Density: 21/sq mi (8.1/km^{2})
- Time zone: UTC-5 (Eastern (EST))
  - Summer (DST): UTC-4 (EDT)
- ZIP code: 05866
- Area code: 802
- FIPS code: 50-64075
- GNIS feature ID: 1462205
- Website: www.sheffieldvt.org

Sheffield is a town in Caledonia County, Vermont, United States. The population was 682 at the 2020 census.

== Geography ==
Sheffield is located in northwestern Caledonia County. It is bordered by the town of Barton to the north, Sutton to the east, Wheelock to the south, and Glover to the west. According to the United States Census Bureau, the town has a total area of 32.8 square miles (84.9 km^{2}), of which 32.5 square miles (84.2 km^{2}) is land and 0.27 square miles (0.7 km^{2}), or 0.79%, is water.

The town is crossed by Interstate 91, leading north to Newport and south to St. Johnsbury. There are no exits within the town. Vermont Route 122 roughly parallels I-91, leading northwest to Glover and Barton and southeast to Lyndonville. The unincorporated village of Sheffield is in the southern part of the town, along Route 122.

The highest point in Sheffield is an unnamed summit in the northeast corner of town, with an elevation of 2,543 feet (775 m) above sea level, between Granby Mountain and Norris Mountain.

== Demographics ==
Historical population
Census	Pop.	Note	%±
1800	170		—
1810	388		128.2%
1820	581		49.7%
1830	720		23.9%
1840	821		14.0%
1850	797		−2.9%
1860	836		4.9%
1870	811		−3.0%
1880	884		9.0%
1890	750		−15.2%
1900	724		−3.5%
1910	691		−4.6%
1920	594		−14.0%
1930	543		−8.6%
1940	465		−14.4%
1950	451		−3.0%
1960	342		−24.2%
1970	307		−10.2%
1980	435		41.7%
1990	541		24.4%
2000	727		34.4%
2010	703		−3.3%
2020	682		−3.0%
U.S. Decennial Census

As of the census of 2000, there were 727 people, 272 households, and 202 families residing in the town. The population density was 22.3 people per square mile (8.6/km^{2}). There were 399 housing units at an average density of 12.2 per square mile (4.7/km^{2}). The racial makeup of the town was 97.52% White, 0.55% Native American, 0.28% from other races, and 1.65% from two or more races. Hispanic or Latino of any race were 1.51% of the population.

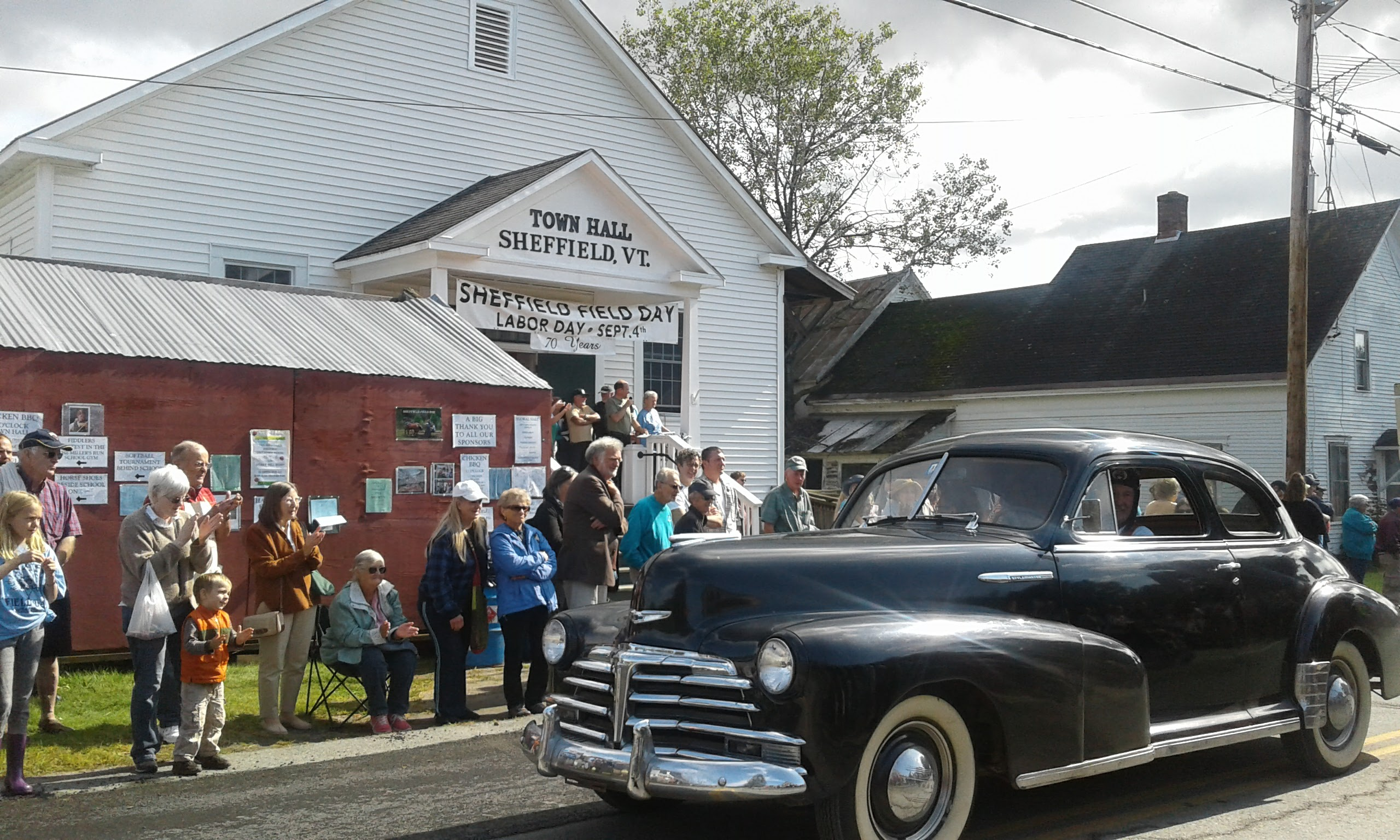
Labor Day parade at Sheffield Field Day 2017.

There were 272 households, out of which 37.9% had children under the age of 18 living with them, 60.3% were married couples living together, 8.5% had a female householder with no husband present, and 25.7% were non-families. 16.5% of all households were made up of individuals, and 4.0% had someone living alone who was 65 years of age or older. The average household size was 2.67 and the average family size was 2.99.

In the town, the population was spread out, with 27.8% under the age of 18, 5.8% from 18 to 24, 31.9% from 25 to 44, 24.5% from 45 to 64, and 10.0% who were 65 years of age or older. The median age was 36 years. For every 100 females, there were 107.7 males. For every 100 females age 18 and over, there were 105.9 males.

The median income for a household in the town was $28,125, and the median income for a family was $31,591. Males had a median income of $27,727 versus $21,500 for females. The per capita income for the town was $13,277. About 19.0% of families and 22.9% of the population were below the poverty line, including 33.1% of those under age 18 and 15.0% of those age 65 or over.

== Government ==
As a result of the construction of a 40-megawatt, 16-turbine wind farm, the town is expected to receive $520,000 annually for 20 years, which was more than its annual municipal budget in 2011.

== Notable people ==
- Malcolm Goldstein, violinist
- Galway Kinnell, poet
