= USS Hepburn =

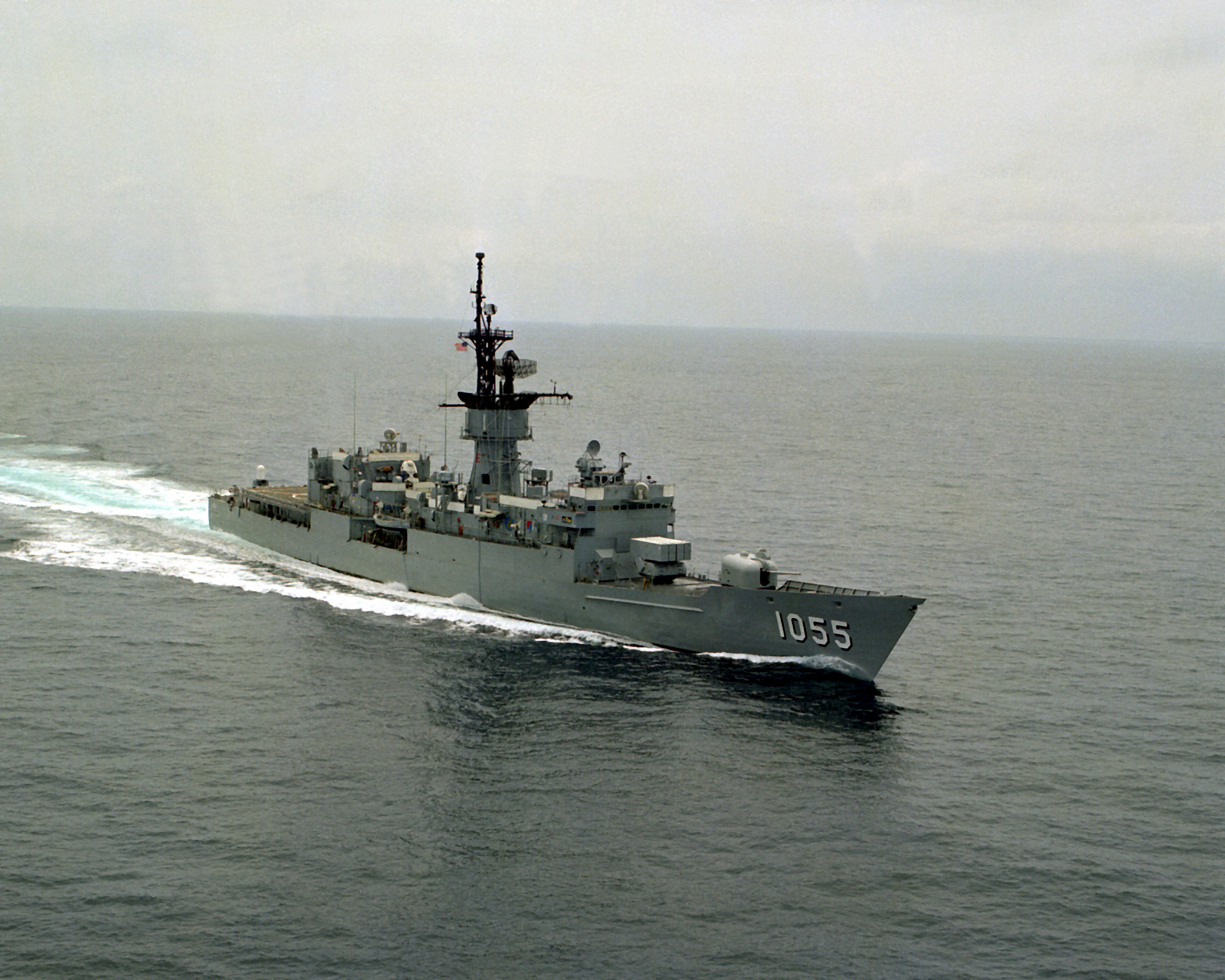
- USS Hepburn (FF-1055) underway

History

United States
- Name: Hepburn
- Namesake: Arthur Japy Hepburn
- Ordered: 22 July 1964
- Builder: Todd Shipyards, Los Angeles Division, San Pedro, California
- Laid down: 1 June 1966
- Launched: 25 March 1967
- Sponsored by: Mrs. Arthur J. Hepburn and Mrs. Lorraine Hepburn Barse
- Acquired: 27 June 1969
- Commissioned: 3 July 1969
- Decommissioned: 20 December 1991
- Stricken: 11 January 1995
- Fate: Sunk as target, 4 June 2002

General characteristics
- Class & type: Knox-class frigate
- Displacement: 3,238 tons (4,231 full load)
- Length: 438 ft (134 m)
- Beam: 46 ft 9 in (14.25 m)
- Draft: 24 ft 9 in (7.54 m)
- Propulsion: 2 × CE 1200psi boilers; 1 Westinghouse geared turbine; 1 shaft, 35,000 shp (26 MW)
- Speed: over 27 knots (31 mph; 50 km/h)
- Range: 4,500 nautical miles (8,330 km) at 20 knots (23 mph; 37 km/h)
- Complement: 18 officers, 267 enlisted
- Sensors & processing systems: AN/SPS-40 Air Search Radar; AN/SPS-67 Surface Search Radar; AN/SQS-26 Sonar; AN/SQR-18 Towed array sonar system; Mk68 Gun Fire Control System
- Electronic warfare & decoys: AN/SLQ-32 Electronics Warfare System
- Armament: one Mk-16 8 cell missile launcher for RUR-5 ASROC and Harpoon missiles; one Mk-42 5-inch/54 caliber gun; Mark 46 torpedoes from four single tube launchers); one Mk-25 BPDMS launcher for Sea Sparrow missiles later replaced by one Phalanx CIWS
- Aircraft carried: one SH-2 Seasprite (LAMPS I) helicopter

USS Hepburn (FF-1055) was a United States Navy Knox-class frigate named for Arthur Japy Hepburn.

== Construction ==
She was laid down 1 June 1966, by Todd Shipyards, Los Angeles Division, San Pedro, California; and launched 25 March 1967; sponsored by Mrs. Arthur J. Hepburn and Mrs. Lorraine Hepburn Barse. She was delivered 27 June 1969, and commissioned 3 July 1969.

=== Design and description ===
The Knox class design was derived from the Brooke-class frigate modified to extend range and without a long-range missile system. The ships had an overall length of 438 feet (133.5 m), a beam of 47 feet (14.3 m) and a draft of 25 feet (7.6 m). They displaced 4,066 long tons (4,131 t) at full load. Their crew consisted of 13 officers and 211 enlisted men.

The ships were equipped with one Westinghouse geared steam turbine that drove the single propeller shaft. The turbine was designed to produce 35,000 shaft horsepower (26,000 kW), using steam provided by 2 C-E boilers, to reach the designed speed of 27 knots (50 km/h; 31 mph). The Knox class had a range of 4,500 nautical miles (8,300 km; 5,200 mi) at a speed of 20 knots (37 km/h; 23 mph).

The Knox-class ships were armed with a 5"/54 caliber Mark 42 gun forward and a single 3-inch/50-caliber gun aft. They mounted an eight-round ASROC launcher between the 5-inch (127 mm) gun and the bridge. Close-range anti-submarine defense was provided by two twin 12.75-inch (324 mm) Mk 32 torpedo tubes. The ships were equipped with a torpedo-carrying DASH drone helicopter; its telescoping hangar and landing pad were positioned amidships aft of the mack. Beginning in the 1970s, the DASH was replaced by a SH-2 Seasprite LAMPS I helicopter and the hangar and landing deck were accordingly enlarged. Most ships also had the 3-inch (76 mm) gun replaced by an eight-cell BPDMS missile launcher in the early 1970s.

== Service history ==
Hepburn was outfitted in 1969 and proceeded for a "shakedown" cruise to San Francisco, Bremerton, WA, Nanaimo and Vancouver, BC and Pearl Harbor, HI. In 1970 she sailed with a contingent of Midshipmen and then a dependents cruise. Hepburn left for her first WESTPAC in January 1971 participating in NGFS operations on the coast of Vietnam and plane guarding carriers in the Gulf of Tonkin. Hepburn transited the Sea of Japan and performed operations while being tailed by two Soviet cruisers. She visited Midway, Guam, Subic Bay in the Philippines, Hong Kong and Sasebo and Yokosuka Japan. Hepburn escorted the carrier Ranger back to the States in June 1971.

Hepburn was an escorting member of the Indian Ocean Task Group of 1976. The task group consisted of the cruiser Fox, frigate Gray and the oiler Passumpsic . The task group sailed from Subic Bay in December 1975. The task group made port calls at Singapore, Karachi, Mombasa, Réunion and Diego Garcia. While transiting from Karachi to the southern Indian Ocean, the group passed through the anchorage area of the Soviet task forces anchored off the island of Socotra. During their time in the Arabian Sea, the task group conducted the first ever acoustical survey of this body of water. The Task group returned to Subic Bay in March 1976.

Hepburn left for WESTPAC in August 1979. She visited Guam, Subic Bay in the Philippines, Australia, Hong Kong and Yokosuka Japan. While in Australia she participated in Exercise Kangaroo III. Upon completion of the exercise, she transited to Melbourne to embark the 7th Fleet Band and then transited to Fremantle/Perth to represent the USA celebrating Western Australia’s 150th anniversary. Hepburn escorted the Guided Missile Destroyer Wilson back to the States in February 1980.

She was decommissioned 20 December 1991 and struck 11 January 1995. Hepburn was sunk as a target on 4 June 2002.
