= Arthur Japy Hepburn =

United States Navy admiral (1877-1964)

- Hepburn in the 1940s during World War II
- Born: 15 October 1877; Carlisle, Pennsylvania, US
- Died: 31 May 1964 (aged 86); Washington, D.C., US
- Burial place: Arlington National Cemetery
- Military career
- Allegiance: United States of America
- Branch: United States Navy
- Service years: 1897–1945
- Rank: Admiral
- Commands: Commander-in-Chief of the United States Fleet
- Conflicts: Spanish–American War; World War I World War II
- Awards: Distinguished Service Medal

Arthur Japy Hepburn (15 October 1877 – 31 May 1964) was an admiral in the United States Navy, whose active-duty career included service in the Spanish–American War, World War I, and World War II. He held a number of high posts in the years between the World Wars, including Director of Naval Intelligence (Office of Naval Intelligence), a U.S. representative to arms control conferences, and Commander-in-Chief of the United States Fleet.

== Biography ==
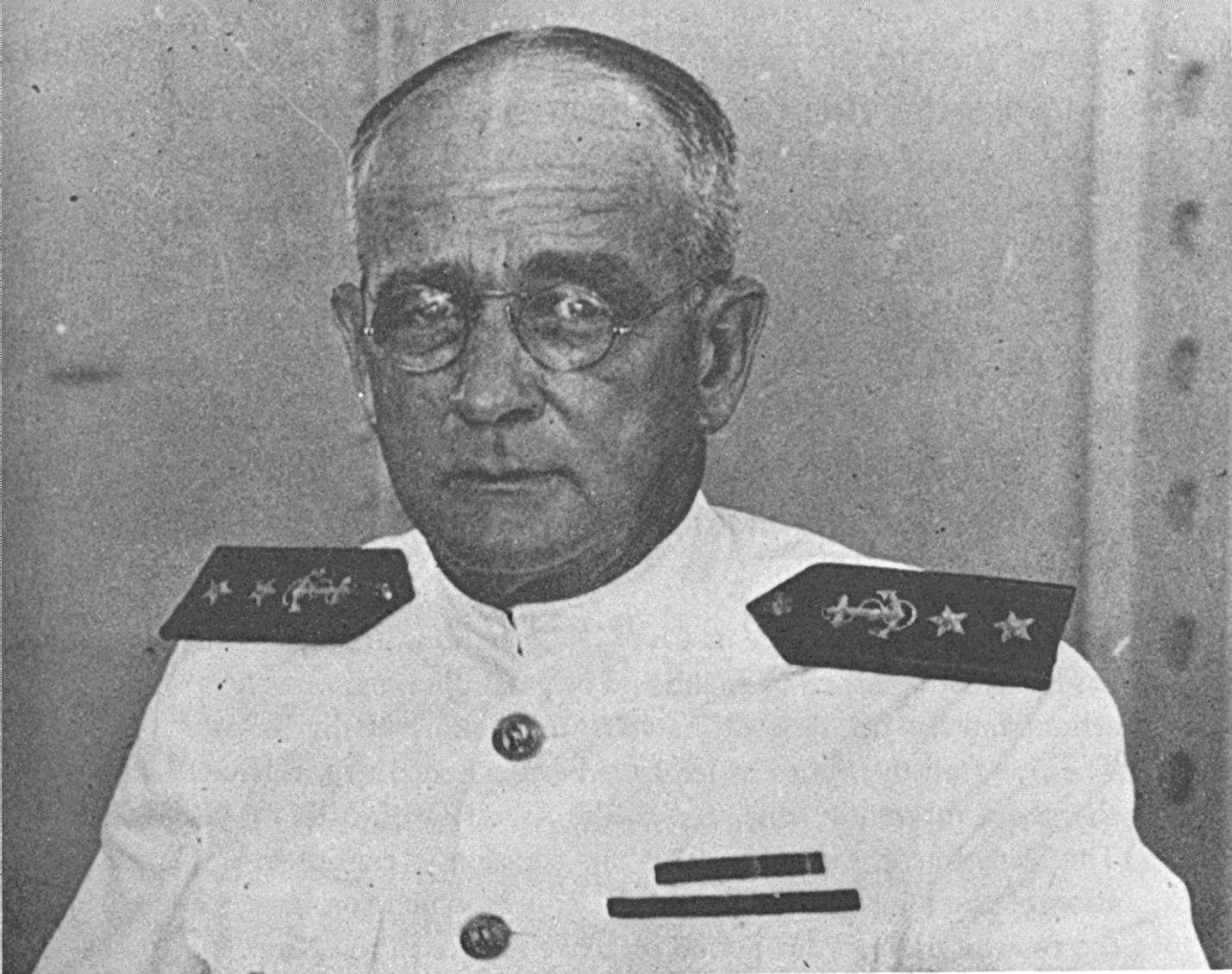
As Senior Naval Advisor to the Geneva Conference delegation in 1932

Hepburn was born on 15 October 1877, in Carlisle, Pennsylvania. He graduated from the Naval Academy in 1897 and served in the Spanish–American War. He participated in the defeat of Admiral Cervera's Spanish Squadron off Santiago, Cuba and was subsequently commissioned at the rank of Ensign.

Thereafter, Hepburn assisted in surveys of the Pacific and performed a variety of other duties, until the First World War, where he commanded the seized German liner Kaiser Wilhelm II and as a submarine commander, until he was ordered to Europe in July 1918 to command the naval base at Queenstown, Ireland. For his service as a Commander of the Naval Base at Queenstown, Hepburn was awarded the Navy Distinguished Service Medal.

After the armistice, he served on the cruiser USS Chester, inspecting German naval ships and aircraft as set out in the terms of the Armistice Treaty.

In 1919 he was appointed the Assistant Chief of the Bureau of Steam Engineering, a post he held until 1922. He then became Chief of Staff of the American Naval Detachment in Turkey; he witnessed the September 1922 destruction of Smyrna and became one of the US Navy officers who played a major role in protecting and evacuating Armenians and Greeks from the city. Thereafter, he served a wide variety of important posts. He took command of the battleship USS West Virginia in May 1925; became Director of Naval Intelligence in July 1926; he served as Chief of Staff with the Battle Fleet and the United States Fleet from 1927 to 1930; and in May 1931 he took command of Submarine Forces, U.S. Fleet. Between 1932 and 1933, he served as a naval member to the Geneva Conference (Limitations of Arms Conference) as Naval Adviser to the Geneva Delegation in Switzerland and as the American Representative at the London Naval Conference.

After commanding the 4th Naval District, and destroyers of the U.S. Fleet, he became Commander in Chief of the entire U.S. Fleet on 24 June 1936, at the rank of Admiral. In the years leading up to the Second World War, as it became increasingly clear that international relations were deteriorating, Hepburn was charged with the task of heading the board (eventually known as the "Hepburn Board") which reviewed the United States defense capabilities. The "Hepburn Board Report" served as the basis for the massive U.S. defense expansion of the late 1930s.

In 1942, Hepburn was appointed Chairman of the General Board of the Navy, serving in that capacity throughout the war. He also later served as a delegate to the Dumbarton Oaks meetings, which established guidelines for founding the United Nations. Hepburn retired in December 1945. He died on 31 May 1964, at Marsalle nursing home in Washington, D.C. He was buried in Arlington National Cemetery.

== See also ==
- USS Hepburn (FF-1055)

Military offices
Preceded by Joseph M. Reeves	Commander in Chief, United States Fleet; 24 June 1936–1938	Succeeded by Claude C. Bloch
