= Moose River (Vermont) =

Tributary of the Connecticut River

Coordinates: 44°25′24″N 72°00′35″W

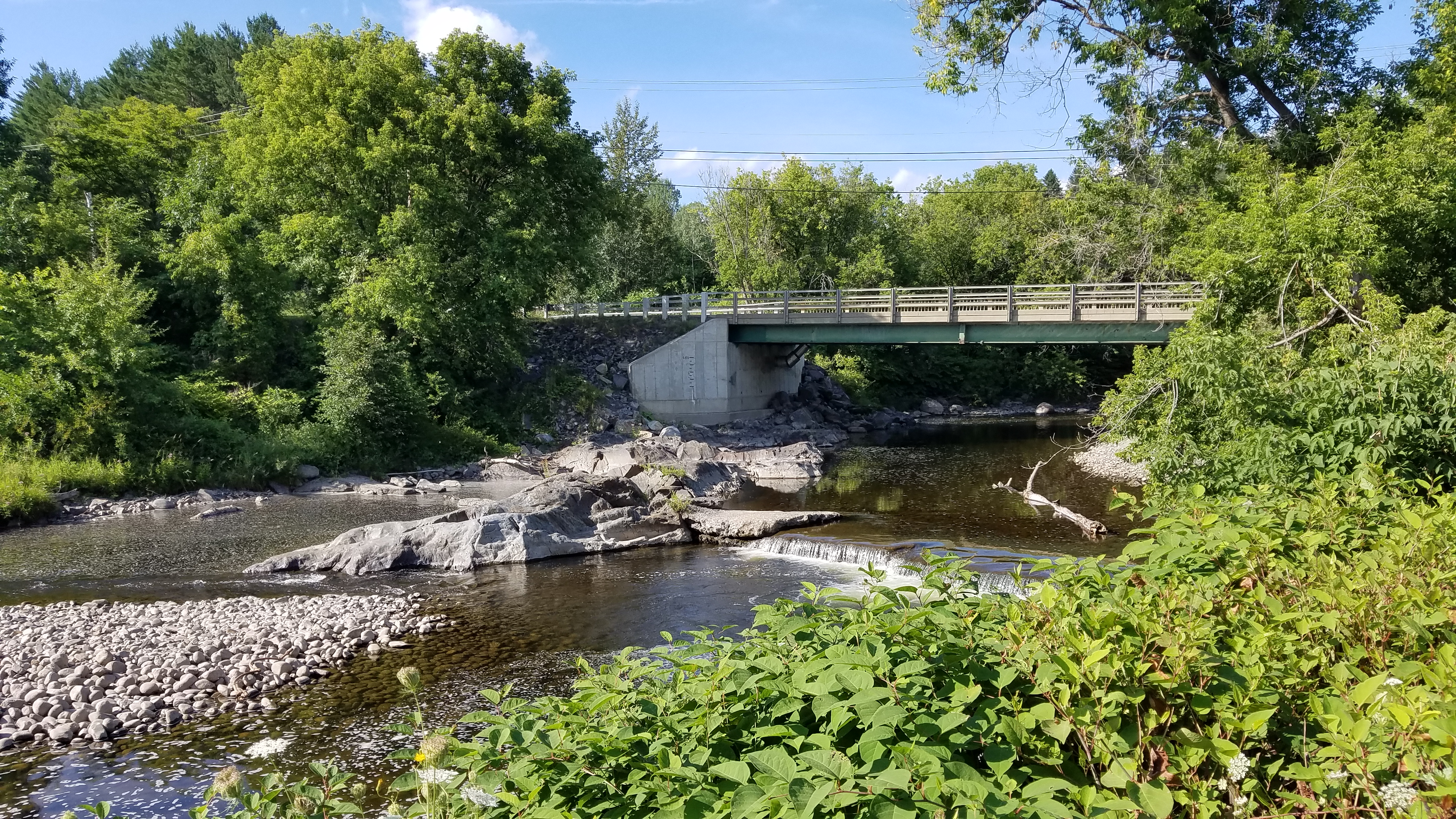
The Moose River just before it joins with the Passumpsic in St. Johnsbury

The Moose River is a small river in the U.S. state of Vermont. It flows into the Passumpsic River at St. Johnsbury, and is part of the Connecticut River basin.

The river is measured by a flow gauge at Victory. One of the shortest rivers in the United States, the Moose is used for whitewater rafting.
