= Sutton, Vermont =

- Town
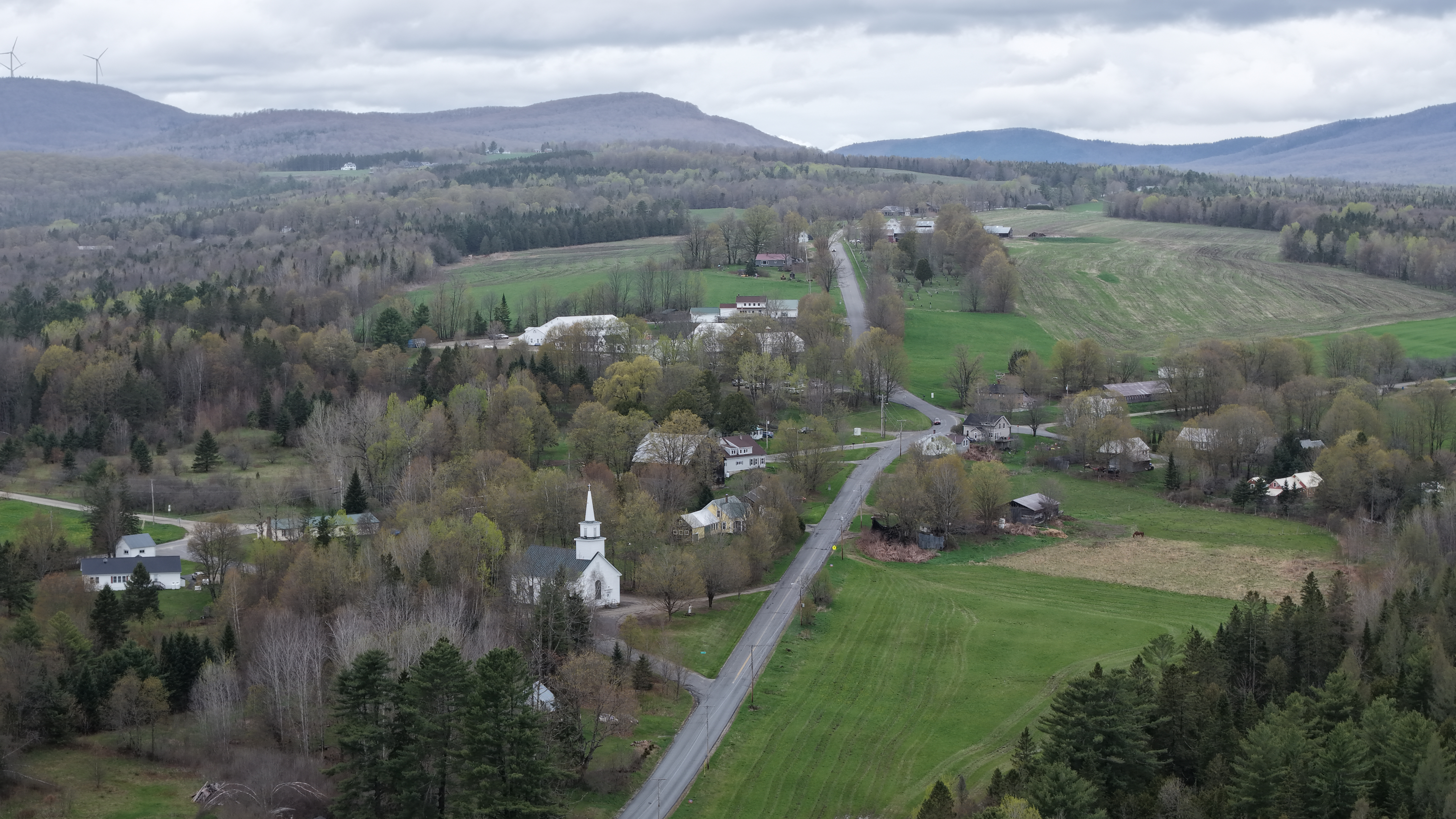
- View of Sutton, VT, from the south

- Seal

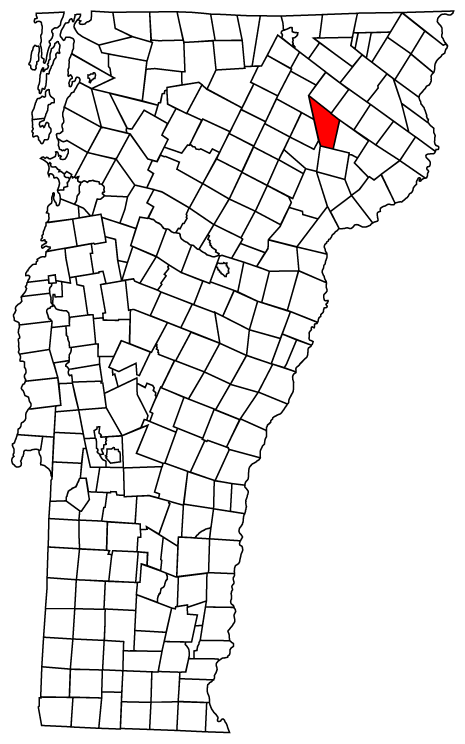
- Sutton, Vermont
- Coordinates: 44°38′15″N 72°01′45″W
- Country: United States
- State: Vermont
- County: Caledonia
- Communities: Sutton; East Sutton Ridge; Perry; Summit; Sutton Station

Area
  - Total: 38.4 sq mi (99.4 km^{2})
  - Land: 38.2 sq mi (98.9 km^{2})
  - Water: 0.19 sq mi (0.5 km^{2})
- Elevation: 1,440 ft (440 m)

Population (2020)
  - Total: 913
  - Density: 24/sq mi (9.2/km^{2})
- Time zone: UTC-5 (Eastern (EST))
  - Summer (DST): UTC-4 (EDT)
- ZIP codes: 05867 (Sutton); 05851 (Lyndonville); 05871 (West Burke)
- Area code: 802
- FIPS code: 50-71575
- GNIS feature ID: 1462224
- Website: www.suttonvt.org

Sutton is a town in Caledonia County, Vermont, United States. The population was 913 at the 2020 census.

== History ==
Sutton was chartered on February 26, 1782, by the Vermont Legislature. Chartered as Billymead to Dr. Jonathan Arnold of Rhode Island and associates, and named for Arnold's younger son, William. By 1810, townsfolk had had enough of Billy and his name due to his bullying and drunken behavior, and at a town meeting they voted overwhelmingly to change the name to Sutton.

Villages and hamlets in Sutton include Sutton, Sutton Depot, and Summit Siding. The population at the 2010 US Census was 1,029.

== Geography ==
Sutton is located in northern Caledonia County. It is bordered by the town of Lyndon to the south, Wheelock to the southwest, Sheffield to the west, Barton to the northwest, Westmore to the north, Newark to the northeast, and Burke to the east. According to the United States Census Bureau, the town has a total area of 38.4 square miles (99.4 km^{2}), of which 38.2 square miles (98.9 km^{2}) is land and 0.19 square miles (0.5 km^{2}), or 0.51%, is water.

The highest point in Sutton is the summit of Mount Hor in the northern corner of town, with an elevation of 2,656 feet (809.5 m) above sea level. The modest elevation of this town gives it a slightly cooler and wetter climate than nearby towns such as St. Johnsbury. Annual snowfall averages well over 100 inches per year at the weather station in the center of town.

== Climate ==
Sutton has a humid continental climate (Koppen: Dfb), typified by large seasonal temperature differences, with warm summers with cool nights and very cold and snowy winters. Exceptionally for such a small town, two NWS-certified weather stations have operated in the town for much of recent history. From January 1948 until spring 2017, the original station, located in a frost hollow at an altitude of about 1000 feet, reported data for the town. In January 2000, a new station was built in a hilly area a few miles away and at about 500 feet higher altitude. This station is still reporting today.

The two stations show distinct microclimates. At the valley station, a freeze has been recorded for every month of the year as well a temperature of at least 60 °F (16 °C). The newer station has a much shorter period of record, but NOAA also lists mean monthly maximum and mean monthly minimum temperatures, which are the highest and lowest temperatures one can expect in a typical month each year. From this one can see that the hill station has much less variability of temperature, with much less chance of frost during the warm months.

Climate data for Sutton 2NE, Vermont, 1991–2020 normals: 1000ft (305m)
Month	Jan	Feb	Mar	Apr	May	Jun	Jul	Aug	Sep	Oct	Nov	Dec	Year
Record high °F (°C)	61 (16)	61 (16)	77 (25)	85 (29)	88 (31)	95 (35)	95 (35)	96 (36)	96 (36)	80 (27)	70 (21)	58 (14)	96 (36)
Mean maximum °F (°C)	44 (7)	46 (8)	57 (14)	75 (24)	83 (28)	88 (31)	89 (32)	88 (31)	84 (29)	73 (23)	62 (17)	46 (8)	90 (32)
Mean daily maximum °F (°C)	22.7 (−5.2)	26.6 (−3.0)	35.9 (2.2)	49.8 (9.9)	64.3 (17.9)	72.4 (22.4)	77.0 (25.0)	75.7 (24.3)	68.3 (20.2)	54.2 (12.3)	40.5 (4.7)	28.8 (−1.8)	51.4 (10.7)
Daily mean °F (°C)	10.7 (−11.8)	12.9 (−10.6)	22.9 (−5.1)	37.3 (2.9)	50.3 (10.2)	59.4 (15.2)	64.0 (17.8)	62.1 (16.7)	54.4 (12.4)	42.4 (5.8)	30.7 (−0.7)	18.9 (−7.3)	38.8 (3.8)
Mean daily minimum °F (°C)	−1.3 (−18.5)	−0.8 (−18.2)	9.8 (−12.3)	24.7 (−4.1)	36.3 (2.4)	46.4 (8.0)	51.0 (10.6)	48.4 (9.1)	40.5 (4.7)	30.7 (−0.7)	20.8 (−6.2)	9.1 (−12.7)	26.3 (−3.2)
Mean minimum °F (°C)	−26 (−32)	−24 (−31)	−17 (−27)	11 (−12)	23 (−5)	32 (0)	39 (4)	36 (2)	27 (−3)	18 (−8)	4 (−16)	−14 (−26)	−29 (−34)
Record low °F (°C)	−38 (−39)	−38 (−39)	−31 (−35)	−1 (−18)	15 (−9)	23 (−5)	31 (−1)	31 (−1)	20 (−7)	11 (−12)	−10 (−23)	−29 (−34)	−38 (−39)
Average precipitation inches (mm)	3.13 (80)	2.66 (68)	3.21 (82)	3.49 (89)	3.93 (100)	4.11 (104)	4.40 (112)	4.86 (123)	3.86 (98)	4.77 (121)	3.51 (89)	4.10 (104)	46.03 (1,170)
Average snowfall inches (cm)	25.8 (66)	29.4 (75)	19.9 (51)	6.4 (16)	0.1 (0.25)	0.0 (0.0)	0.0 (0.0)	0.0 (0.0)	0.0 (0.0)	0.8 (2.0)	7.0 (18)	24.2 (61)	113.6 (289.25)
Source 1: NOAA
Source 2: XMACIS (records & monthly max/mins)

Four miles away on a hill, a recently built weather station has data for the period from 2000 to 2020 only. The daily temperature amplitude is smaller, with warmer lows and cooler highs. Yet, despite the higher elevation of the new station, its temperatures are slightly warmer than at the valley station. There is more rain and snow here, as well.

Climate data for Sutton, Vermont, 2000–2020 normals: 1500ft (457m)
Month	Jan	Feb	Mar	Apr	May	Jun	Jul	Aug	Sep	Oct	Nov	Dec	Year
Record high °F (°C)	59 (15)	64 (18)	77 (25)	85 (29)	91 (33)	90 (32)	92 (33)	92 (33)	92 (33)	79 (26)	66 (19)	55 (13)	92 (33)
Mean maximum °F (°C)	44 (7)	47 (8)	56 (13)	75 (24)	82 (28)	86 (30)	86 (30)	86 (30)	83 (28)	73 (23)	60 (16)	48 (9)	89 (32)
Mean daily maximum °F (°C)	23.2 (−4.9)	27.1 (−2.7)	36.1 (2.3)	49.4 (9.7)	63.2 (17.3)	70.7 (21.5)	75.9 (24.4)	74.9 (23.8)	68.2 (20.1)	54.1 (12.3)	40.4 (4.7)	29.3 (−1.5)	51.0 (10.6)
Daily mean °F (°C)	13.6 (−10.2)	16.9 (−8.4)	25.9 (−3.4)	39.4 (4.1)	52.7 (11.5)	60.9 (16.1)	66.1 (18.9)	64.6 (18.1)	57.6 (14.2)	44.8 (7.1)	32.5 (0.3)	21.1 (−6.1)	41.3 (5.2)
Mean daily minimum °F (°C)	4.0 (−15.6)	6.6 (−14.1)	15.7 (−9.1)	29.4 (−1.4)	42.2 (5.7)	51.0 (10.6)	56.2 (13.4)	54.4 (12.4)	47.1 (8.4)	35.5 (1.9)	24.7 (−4.1)	12.8 (−10.7)	31.6 (−0.2)
Mean minimum °F (°C)	−18 (−28)	−14 (−26)	−7 (−22)	16 (−9)	29 (−2)	38 (3)	46 (8)	44 (7)	32 (0)	23 (−5)	8 (−13)	−8 (−22)	−20 (−29)
Record low °F (°C)	−30 (−34)	−26 (−32)	−19 (−28)	3 (−16)	25 (−4)	32 (0)	42 (6)	39 (4)	25 (−4)	17 (−8)	−2 (−19)	−25 (−32)	−30 (−34)
Average precipitation inches (mm)	3.04 (77)	3.00 (76)	3.29 (84)	3.89 (99)	4.28 (109)	4.55 (116)	4.96 (126)	4.71 (120)	3.58 (91)	4.67 (119)	3.69 (94)	3.87 (98)	47.53 (1,209)
Average snowfall inches (cm)	31.3 (80)	35.8 (91)	23.5 (60)	9.2 (23)	0.6 (1.5)	0.0 (0.0)	0.0 (0.0)	0.0 (0.0)	0.0 (0.0)	1.6 (4.1)	12.0 (30)	27.7 (70)	141.7 (359.6)
Source 1: XMACIS (Temp normals & max/mins)
Source 2: NOAA (Precipitation & Snow)

== Demographics ==
Historical population
Census	Pop.	Note	%±
1800	144		—
1810	433		200.7%
1820	697		61.0%
1830	1,005		44.2%
1840	1,068		6.3%
1850	1,001		−6.3%
1860	987		−1.4%
1870	920		−6.8%
1880	838		−8.9%
1890	746		−11.0%
1900	694		−7.0%
1910	711		2.4%
1920	659		−7.3%
1930	596		−9.6%
1940	561		−5.9%
1950	528		−5.9%
1960	476		−9.8%
1970	438		−8.0%
1980	667		52.3%
1990	854		28.0%
2000	1,001		17.2%
2010	1,029		2.8%
2020	913		−11.3%
U.S. Decennial Census

As of the census of 2000, there were 1,001 people, 366 households, and 270 families residing in the town. The population density was 26.2 people per square mile (10.1/km^{2}). There were 439 housing units at an average density of 11.5 per square mile (4.4/km^{2}). The racial makeup of the town was 97.60% White, 0.20% Native American, 0.20% Asian, 1.20% from other races, and 0.80% from two or more races. Hispanic or Latino of any race were 0.40% of the population.

There were 366 households, out of which 38.3% had children under the age of 18 living with them, 61.5% were married couples living together, 6.3% had a female householder with no husband present, and 26.2% were non-families. 18.6% of all households were made up of individuals, and 7.7% had someone living alone who was 65 years of age or older. The average household size was 2.73 and the average family size was 3.10.

In the town, the population was spread out, with 29.8% under the age of 18, 5.8% from 18 to 24, 27.9% from 25 to 44, 25.0% from 45 to 64, and 11.6% who were 65 years of age or older. The median age was 37 years. For every 100 females, there were 102.2 males. For every 100 females age 18 and over, there were 102.0 males.

The median income for a household in the town was $36,750, and the median income for a family was $40,368. Males had a median income of $27,303 versus $25,000 for females. The per capita income for the town was $14,564. About 10.5% of families and 13.0% of the population were below the poverty line, including 22.2% of those under age 18 and 17.9% of those age 65 or over.

== Notable people ==
- Luis Guzmán, actor
- Edward Hoagland, essayist
- Henry Oscar Houghton, co-founder of Houghton Mifflin
- Garret Keizer, author and essayist
