= Garret Keizer =

American writer and poet

Garret Keizer (born 1953) is an American author, poet and essayist.

Keizer was born in New Jersey and studied English at Montclair State University. He moved to Vermont’s Northeast Kingdom in 1979 when he was 26. He lives with his family in Sutton, Vermont.

Keizer has written numerous critically acclaimed books. He is also a regular contributor to Harper's Magazine. He has served as an Episcopal priest and a high school English teacher.

== Honors and awards ==
Keizer was awarded a Guggenheim Fellowship in 2006. His first published book of poetry, The World Pushes Back, won the X. J. Kennedy Poetry Prize in 2018. He was inducted into the Vermont Academy of Arts and Sciences in 2019.

== Authored books ==
- No Place But Here: A Teacher's Vocation in a Rural Community, Viking, 1988
- The Enigma of Anger: Essays on a Sometimes Deadly Sin, Jossey-Bass, 2002
- A Dresser of Sycamore Trees: The Finding of A Ministry, Viking, 1991
- Keizer (2004). Help: The Original Human Dilemma. Harper One. ISBN 0060560622.
- Keizer (2002). God of Beer. HarperCollins. ISBN 0060294574.
- Privacy, Picador, 2012
- Keizer, Garret (2010). The unwanted sound of everything we want: a book about noise (1. ed.). New York, NY: Public Affairs. ISBN 9781586485528.
- Getting Schooled: The Reeducation of an American Teacher, Henry Holt, 2014
- The World Pushes Back, Texas Review Press, 2019

== Selected articles ==
- Requiem for the Private Word - Harper's Magazine - August 2008
- Specific suggestion: General strike - Harper's Magazine - October 2007
- Left, Right and Wrong - Mother Jones - March/April 2005
- Sound and Fury - Harper's Magazine - March 2001
- Life Everlasting - Harper's Magazine - February 2005
- Loaded - Harper's Magazine - December 2006
