= USS Passumpsic =

Oiler of the United States Navy

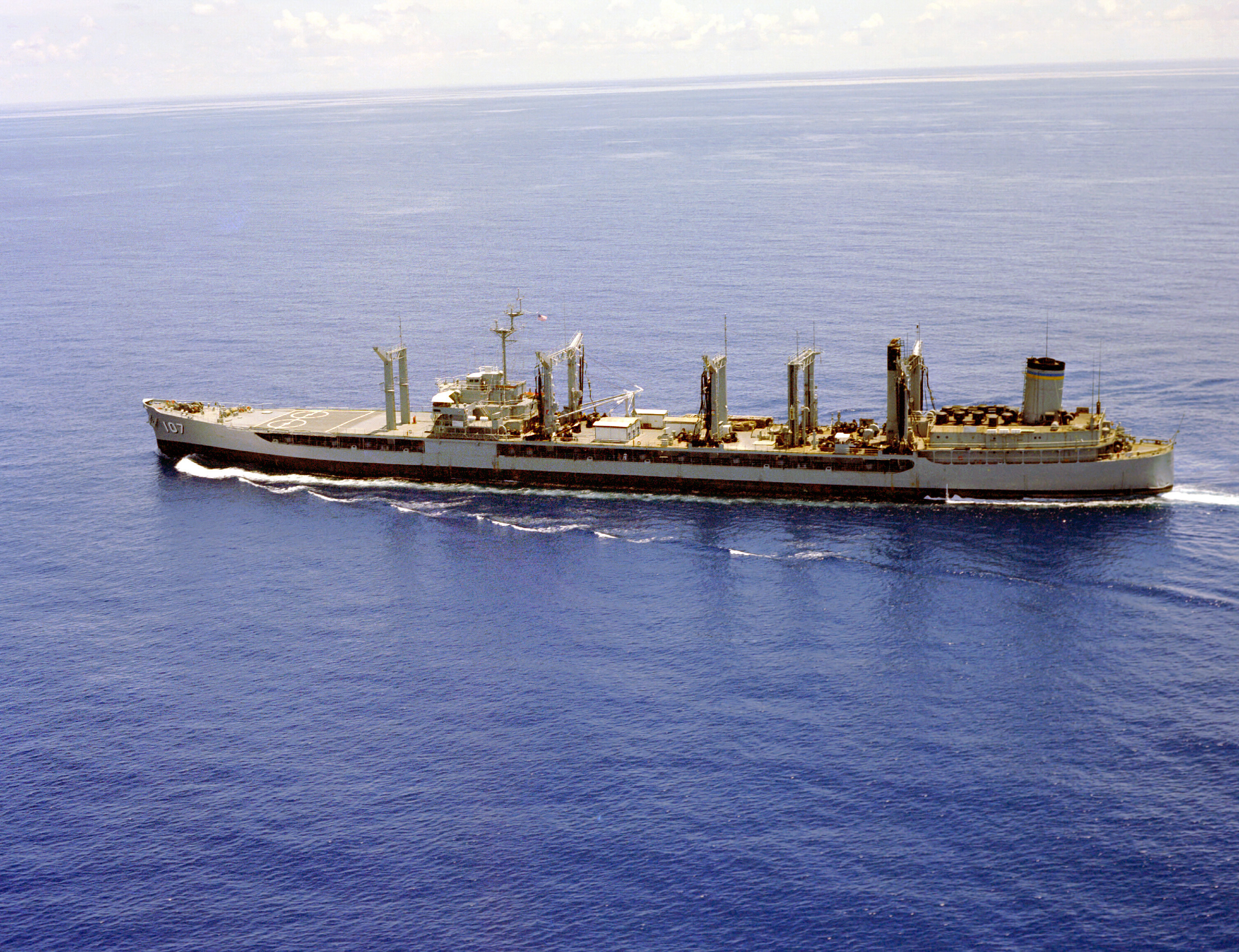
- USNS Passumpsic (T-AO-107) in 1984

History

United States
- Name: USS Passumpsic
- Namesake: The Passumpsic River in Vermont
- Builder: Sun Shipbuilding and Drydock Company, Chester, Pennsylvania
- Laid down: 8 March 1945
- Launched: 31 October 1945
- Commissioned: 1 April 1946
- Decommissioned: 24 July 1973
- In service: 1975
- Out of service: December 1991
- Reclassified: T-AO-107 on 24 July 1973
- Stricken: 17 December 1991 or 18 December 1991
- Identification: IMO number: 7737145
- Honors and awards: Nine battle stars for Korean War service; Personnel serving aboard Passumpsic during Operation Desert Storm may wear the Combat Action Ribbon
- Fate: Sold for scrapping 19 December 1991

General characteristics
- Class & type: Ashtabula-class oiler
- Displacement: As built: 7,423 tons (light); 25,500 tons (full load); After "jumboization": 12,840 tons (light); 34,350 tons (full load)
- Length: As built: 553 ft (169 m); After "jumboization": 644 ft (196 m)
- Beam: 75 ft (23 m)
- Draft: As built: 32 ft (9.8 m); After "jumboization": 36 ft (11 m)
- Installed power: 30,400 hp (22,700 kW)
- Propulsion: geared turbines, twin screws
- Speed: 18.3 knots (33.9 km/h)
- Capacity: 146,000 barrels (23,200 m^{3}) of fuel oil
- Complement: 304 (as USS Passumpsic)
- Crew: 108 civilians plus a detachment of U.S. Navy personnel (as USNS Passumpsic)
- Armament: 1 × 5 in (130 mm) 38-caliber gun; 4 × 3 in (76 mm) 50-caliber guns; 8 × 40 mm antiaircraft guns (4 × 2); 8 × 20 mm antiaircraft guns (4 × 2)
- Notes: "Jumboization" involved the lengthening of Passumpsic's hull and installation of additional cargo capacity during 1964–65.

USS Passumpsic (AO-107), the only United States Navy ship to bear the name, was an Ashtabula-class fleet replenishment oiler that served in the U.S. Navy from 1946 to 1973, then transferred to the Military Sealift Command to continue service as United States Naval Ship USNS Passumpsic (T-AO-107). She was the only U.S. Navy ship to bear the name Passumpsic, after the Passumpsic River in Vermont.

== Construction and commissioning ==
USS Passumpsic (AO-107) was laid down on 8 March 1945 as Maritime Commission Hull 2703 by Sun Shipbuilding and Drydock Company, Chester, Pennsylvania. She was launched on 31 October 1945, sponsored by Mrs. M. F. Draemel, wife of Rear Admiral Milo F. Draemel, then Commandant of the 4th Naval District, and commissioned on 1 April 1946. Due to her beginning as a "Maritime" Hull, Passumpsic has the distinction of being one of only six naval ships to have her Frame numbers running from Aft - Forward, instead of Forward to Aft.

== Service career, 1946–64 ==
After a shakedown in the Caribbean Sea, Passumpsic operated out of Long Beach, California, under the control of Commander, Service Force Pacific, servicing U.S. Pacific Fleet units while attached to Service Squadron 1 and Service Squadron 3. She visited Japan, Taiwan, Korea, Southeast Asia, Hong Kong, North Borneo, the Fiji Islands, Australia, Arabia, Ceylon, the Philippines, Midway Atoll, Oahu, the Marshall Islands, and the Mariana Islands.

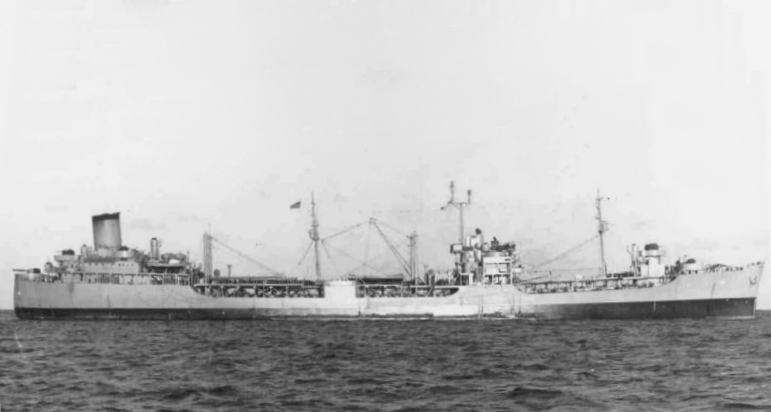
USS Passumpsic as built

From June 1950 through February 1954, Passumpsic spent 34 of 44 months outside the United States. Though not subjected to hostile fire during the Korean War, Passumpsic received nine battlestars for her Korean War service.

Passumpsic’s assignments after the Korean War entailed annual deployments to the Western Pacific.

== "Jumboization" ==
Upon return from deployment in April 1964, Passumpsic underwent an INSURV Board inspection at Long Beach Naval Shipyard in preparation for "Jumboization," a project of modernization and renovation for Mispillion-class fleet oilers. She steamed on 12 October 1964 for the American Shipbuilding Company yard at Lorain, Ohio, where the conversion was to take place. At Boston Naval Shipyard a Supply Overhaul Assistance Program (SOAP) was set up to sort, identify, and repackage the ship's stock of repair parts and to receive, sort, and stow the repair parts supplied by the contractor and the U.S. Navy in conjunction with the conversion programs. After passage through the Panama Canal and St. Lawrence Seaway, Passumpsic was placed "in commission, in reserve" on 26 November 1964 and most of her crew detached, leaving a nucleus party of four officers and 28 enlisted men under the command of Lcdr. James. K. Beates. The ship was then turned over to the American Shipbuilding Company.

The conversion involved transferring her existing midships superstructure to a newly constructed tank section. The original hull was cut and the bow and stern sections were added to the new tank section. Conversion modifications increased Passumpsic's length by 91 feet (28 m), her light displacement from 7,423 tons to 12,840 tons, her full-load displacement from 25,500 to 34,350 tons, and her maximum draft from 32 feet (9.8 m) to 36 feet (11 m).

Passumpsic departed Lorain on 22 November 1965 with a merchant marine master and civilian crew. She arrived at the Boston Army Base piers, South Boston, Massachusetts, on 1 December 1965.

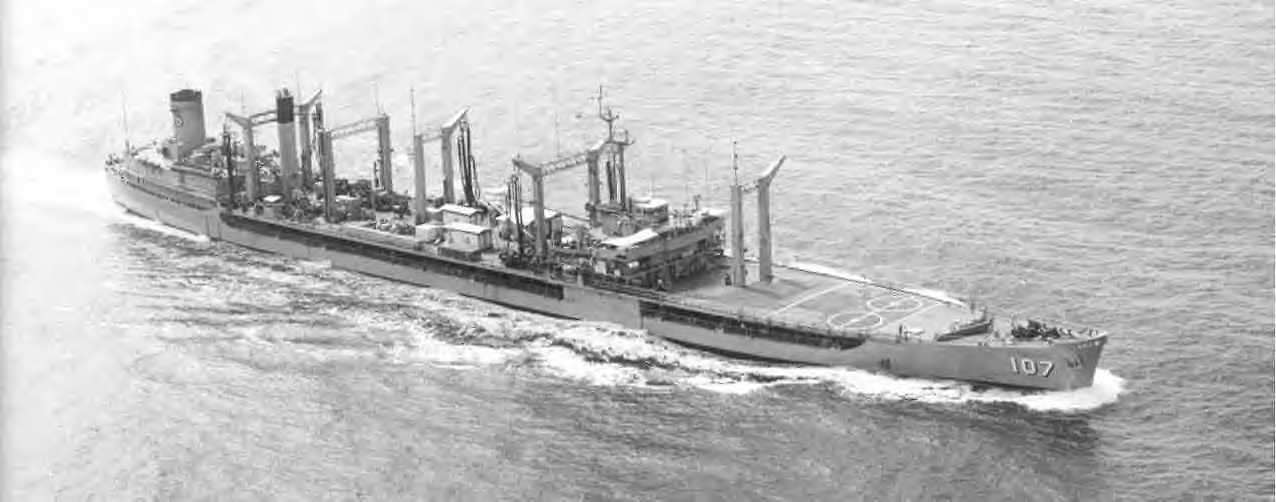
USS Passumpsic after completion of "jumboization".

Accepted by the U.S. Navy at Boston, on 10 January 1966, Passumpsic fitted out at Boston Naval Shipyard throughout February and into March, departing 5 March 1966 for Norfolk, Virginia, to load oil and for degaussing inspection.

Passumpsic departed Norfolk on 11 March 1966 for her home port of Long Beach, California, arriving there on 6 April 1966. Final U.S. Navy acceptance came on 24 August 1966, and she was designated a ready unit under Commander Task Group 13.1 (CTG 13.1) on 1 September 1966.

== 1966–73 ==
Passumpsic departed Long Beach on 22 September 1966 and arrived at Subic Bay in the Philippine Islands on 15 October 1966. From Subic Bay the oiler steamed on replenishment operations off the coasts of North Vietnam and South Vietnam. She continued to service U.S. Navy units in the Western Pacific until May 1967, when she returned to her home port.

Passumpsic departed Long Beach in November 1967 for the Western Pacific and again operated from Subic Bay to serve ships operating in the Vietnam War combat zone and making port visits between underway replenishment assignments. She returned to Long Beach in June 1968.

In November 1968 Passumpsic again deployed to the Western Pacific to operate out of Subic Bay in support of ships operating off of Vietnam. She returned to Long Beach 27 June 1969 for yard availability, local training operations, and preparations for her next Western Pacific deployment.

Passumpsic remained in commissioned service with the U.S. Navy until 1973, although her activities between mid-1969 and 1973 are not readily available and await further research.

On 24 July 1973, Passumpsic was decommissioned. She transferred to the Military Sealift Command on the same day, becoming United States Naval Ship USNS Passumpsic (T-AO-107). Under this new designation, she continued in service in support of the U.S. Navy with a civilian crew from 1973 until 1991.

== Later career and disposition ==
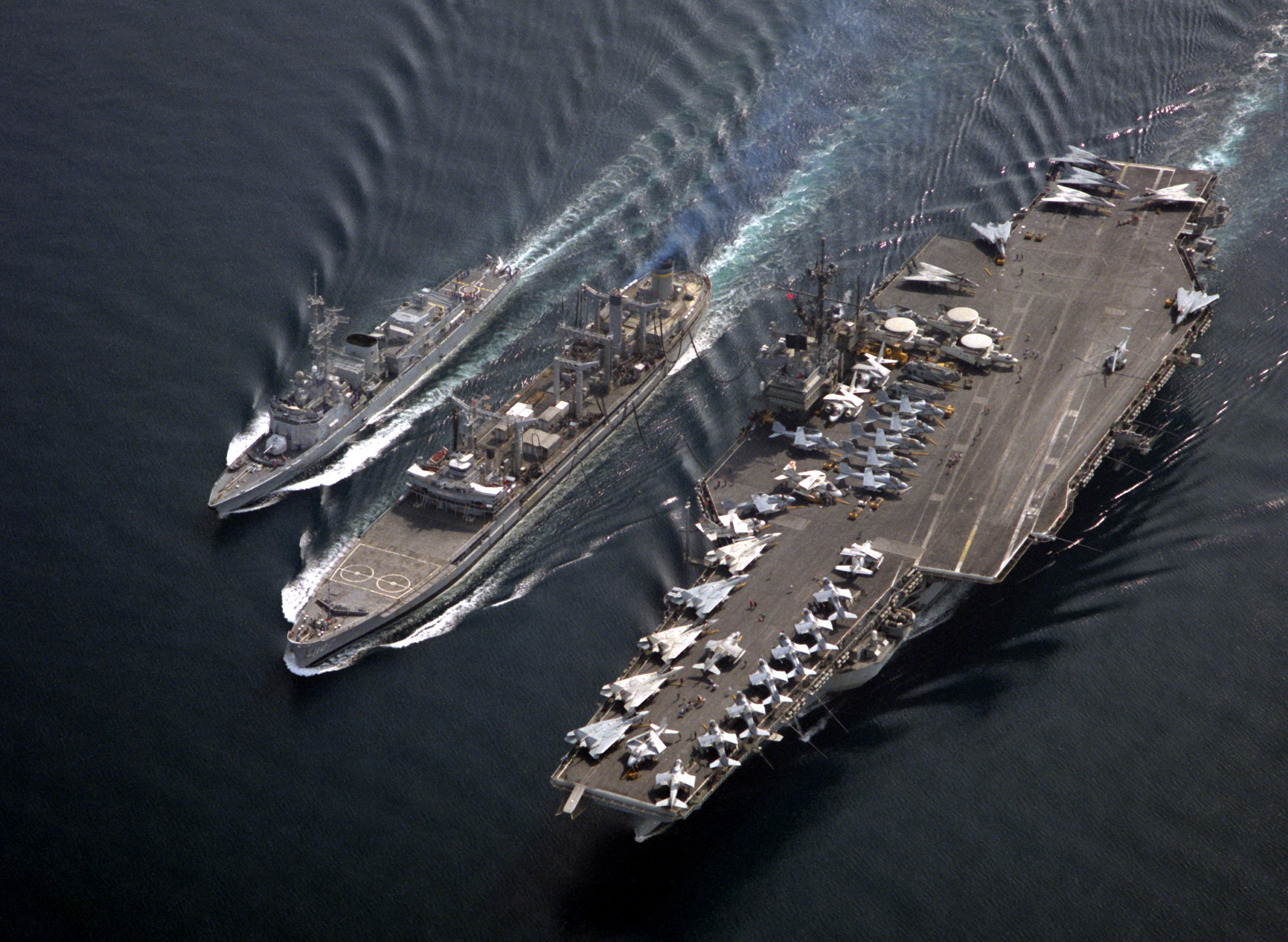
Passumpsic refueling the aircraft carrier Ranger and French frigate Latouche-Tréville during the 1991 Gulf War.

Passumpsic began active service with the Military Sealift Command in 1973. On June 30, 1974, the USNS Passumpsic in support of the CLG USS Chicago, DD USS George K. Mackenzie, and the DE USS Fanning passed through the Straits of Malacca into the Indian Ocean for a 90-day deployment. One of her first tasks was a three-month deployment from Subic Bay as part of the 1975-1976 Indian Ocean task group. The task group consisted of the cruiser Fox and the frigates Gray and Hepburn. The task group was replenished in the Arabian Sea by the supply vessel White Plains. At the end of her career, she supported ships operating in Operation Desert Storm in Iraq in 1991. USN personnel serving aboard USNS Passumpsic during Operation Desert Storm are eligible for the Combat Action Ribbon.

Passumsic provided moorage services for submarines such as the USS Bremerton (SSN698) in 1984 visiting Hong Kong.

Passumpsic was in Subic Bay at Luzon in the Philippine Islands when Mount Pinatubo erupted in 1991, suffering extensive damage to her Underway replenishment (UNREP) gear caused by a mixture of volcanic ash and rain water from a passing typhoon.

Passumpsic was stricken from the Navy List in December 1991; sources differ on whether the date was 17 December 1991 or 18 December 1991 She was sold to a Singaporean firm for scrapping on 19 December 1991. She was resold to an Indian firm on 1 July 1992 for scrapping in India.
