= Caledonia County, Vermont =

County in Vermont, United States

- County
- St. Johnsbury, Vermont

- Location within the U.S. state of Vermont
- Coordinates: 44.46°N 72.10°W
- Country: United States
- State: Vermont
- Founded: 1796
- Named for: Latin name for Scotland
- Shire Town: St. Johnsbury
- Largest town: St. Johnsbury

Government
  - State's Attorney • Assistant Judges • Probate Judge • Sheriff • High Bailiff: Claire Burns (R/D); John S. Hall (D); Roy C. Vance (R/D); William W. Cobb (D); James Hemond (D/R); Robert Gerrish (R)

Area
  - Total: 658 sq mi (1,700 km^{2})
  - Land: 649 sq mi (1,680 km^{2})
  - Water: 8.7 sq mi (23 km^{2}) 1.3%

Population (2020)
  - Total: 30,233
  - Estimate (2025): 30,414 ▲
  - Density: 46.6/sq mi (18.0/km^{2})
- Demonym: Caledonian
- Time zone: UTC−5 (Eastern)
  - Summer (DST): UTC−4 (EDT)
- Congressional district: At-large

Caledonia County is a county located in the northeastern part of the U.S. state of Vermont. As of the 2020 census, the population was 30,233. Its shire town (county seat) is the town of St. Johnsbury. The county was created in 1792 and organized in 1796. It was given the Latin name for Scotland, in honor of the many settlers who claimed ancestry there.

== History ==
The county shares the same pre-Columbian history with the Northeast Kingdom.

Rogers' Rangers were forced to retreat through the county following their attack on Saint-Francis, Quebec in 1759. To confound their avenging pursuers, they had split up. One group came south over the summit into the Passumpsic River Valley.

Vermont was divided into two counties in March 1778. In 1781 the legislature divided the northernmost county, Cumberland, into three counties. Windham and Windsor Counties were located about where they are now. The northern remainder was called Orange County. The latter tract nearly corresponded with the old New York county of Gloucester, organized by that province March 16, 1770, with Newbury as the shire town.

On November 5, 1792, the legislature divided Chittenden and Orange Counties into six separate counties, as follows: Chittenden, Orange, Franklin, Caledonia, Essex, and Orleans. There is a supposition that the county was called Caledonia, to commemorate the large number of Scottish settlers.

Caledonians joined the Union Army in response to a call for volunteers. In September 1861, they joined the Vermont 6th Vermont Infantry, and helped fill out Companies B, D and E. The regiment ultimately became part of the First Vermont Brigade.

In 2008, the county was declared a federal disaster area as the result of storms and flooding which occurred on July 18.

== Geography ==
According to the U.S. Census Bureau, the county has a total area of 658 square miles (1,700 km^{2}), of which 649 square miles (1,680 km^{2}) is land and 8.7 square miles (23 km^{2}) (1.3%) is water.

Caledonia is the most populated county of the three in the Northeast Kingdom. However, it is the smallest in area of the three.

The county has a number of brooks and rivers. The Connecticut River runs along the southeast and forms one of the eastern boundaries of the county. The northern towns are drained by the head branches of the Passumpsic River, which is the largest in the county. It flows south and empties into the Connecticut River in Barnet. There are the Wells, Stevens and Joe's Rivers in the south. In the west the head waters of the Winooski and Lamoille Rivers. There are about twenty lakes and ponds in the county. The largest are Harvey's Lake, in Barnet; Wells River and Lund's Ponds, in Groton; Cole's Pond, in Walden; Clark's and Center Ponds, in Newark; and Stile's Pond, in Waterford. There are falls at different places on the Connecticut, Passumpsic, Wells and Joe's Rivers. Stevens River, near its mouth, falls 80 feet (24 m) in a distance of 20 rods (330 ft; 100 m). Some of the water power has been harnessed for electricity.

There are sulphur springs in Wheelock, Haynesville, in Hardwick; and in St. Johnsbury, near the Moose River.

=== Geology ===
Calciferous mica schist underlies much of the county. There is argillaceous slate running through Waterford and Kirby, which narrows in Burke.

Waterford had a lot of talc. This belongs to the gold bearing formations. Specimens of gold were found in town, and iron and copper pyrites in veins. But none in commercial quality. In Waterford there was an outcrop of slate that was quarried for roofing. Kirby Mountain, in Kirby, was largely granite of commercial quality.

Ryegate had 300 acres (120 ha) granite on the south and west sides of Blue Mountain. The granite was created by volcanic action. This was a medium colored granite of commercial grain and texture. It was quarried in the 19th century. It lay in sheets 3 inches (76 mm) to 10 feet (3.0 m) or 15 feet (4.6 m).

Perhaps the most widely known monument locally using this granite was the soldiers monument at Peacham, Vermont. Monuments from this granite exist all over the country. This was one of the best quality quarries in the country in the 19th century.

The presence of Kame terraces in the country are of interest in connection with the drift that gave the Northeast Kingdom its soil, and its surface stones and boulders. These terraces have beds of sand and clay from which bricks were once manufactured.

Based on research by Edward Hitchcock two or three basins can be identified based on a larger number of interconnected terraces in the Passumpsic River Valley.

The first extends from the mouth of the Passumpsic River in Barnet, to the northwest corner of the town of Waterford, on the railroad. It is about 4 miles (6.4 km) long. The river runs through a narrow valley in Barnet, a gorge with no terraces. Narrow terraces in the Town of Passumpsic expand and form a basin. The fourth terrace on the west side of the river is part of the next basin, which is in St. Johnsbury and Lyndon. St. Johnsbury Village is on this high terrace which is called "St. Johnsbury Plain". The base of the terraces at St. Johnsbury is composed of clay. The same terrace occurs on both sides of the river valley beyond Lyndon. There are lower terraces at intervals.

Lyndonville has a high terrace. This may have once extended across the valley to form the end of a basin. Its lower strata are clayey, and are folded and curved. West of this terrace the level is lower. There is the course of a former river bed which ran towards the east. At the upper village of Lyndon the first terrace is about 1 mile (1.6 km) wide. There is a lot of sand and fine gravel adjoining.

Every stream from either side of the valley has its large terraces to correspond with those of the Passumpsic River. It is a characteristic of these terraces that they are large while their quantity is small. The count never exceeds five which is unusual.

The third basin includes the east branch of the Passumpsic River which runs through the Town of Burke. In East Burke there are several terraces. Near the village there are four on the west side, and two on the east side. Above East Burke the valley rises so that its bottom appears like a terrace. Its steep slope crosses the valley at right angles. There are indistinct terraces on its sides. Since the valley seems to be too wide to correspond with the size of the river, the valley may have been formed by water from unknown sources in prehistoric times.

Caledonia has more muck deposits than any other county in the state. This was once thought to be profitable for farmers.

=== Adjacent counties ===
- Orleans County – north
- Essex County – northeast
- Grafton County, New Hampshire – southeast
- Washington County – southwest
- Orange County – south
- Lamoille County – west

== Demographics ==
Historical population
Census	Pop.	Note	%±
1800	9,377		—
1810	18,740		99.9%
1820	16,669		−11.1%
1830	20,967		25.8%
1840	21,891		4.4%
1850	23,595		7.8%
1860	21,708		−8.0%
1870	22,235		2.4%
1880	23,607		6.2%
1890	23,436		−0.7%
1900	24,381		4.0%
1910	26,031		6.8%
1920	25,762		−1.0%
1930	27,253		5.8%
1940	24,320		−10.8%
1950	24,049		−1.1%
1960	22,786		−5.3%
1970	22,789		0.0%
1980	25,808		13.2%
1990	27,846		7.9%
2000	29,702		6.7%
2010	31,227		5.1%
2020	30,233		−3.2%
2025 (est.)	30,414	▲	0.6%
U.S. Decennial Census; 1790–1960 1900–1990; 1990–2000 2010–2018

=== 2020 census ===
As of the 2020 census, the county had a population of 30,233. Of the residents, 20.2% were under the age of 18 and 22.6% were 65 years of age or older; the median age was 45.3 years. For every 100 females there were 98.9 males, and for every 100 females age 18 and over there were 97.7 males.

The racial makeup of the county was 91.5% White, 0.8% Black or African American, 0.3% American Indian and Alaska Native, 1.2% Asian, 0.7% from some other race, and 5.5% from two or more races. Hispanic or Latino residents of any race comprised 2.0% of the population.

There were 12,654 households in the county, of which 25.8% had children under the age of 18 living with them and 25.3% had a female householder with no spouse or partner present. About 29.7% of all households were made up of individuals and 14.8% had someone living alone who was 65 years of age or older.

There were 15,997 housing units, of which 20.9% were vacant. Among occupied housing units, 73.3% were owner-occupied and 26.7% were renter-occupied. The homeowner vacancy rate was 1.9% and the rental vacancy rate was 7.2%.

Caledonia County, Vermont – Racial and ethnic composition Note: the US Census treats Hispanic/Latino as an ethnic category. This table excludes Latinos from the racial categories and assigns them to a separate category. Hispanics/Latinos may be of any race.
Race / Ethnicity (NH = Non-Hispanic)	Pop 2000	Pop 2010	Pop 2020	% 2000	% 2010	% 2020
White alone (NH)	28,812	29,909	27,465	97.00%	95.77%	90.87%
Black or African American alone (NH)	82	150	214	0.27%	0.48%	0.70%
Native American or Alaska Native alone (NH)	160	127	94	0.53%	0.40%	0.31%
Asian alone (NH)	110	251	363	0.37%	0.80%	1.20%
Pacific Islander alone (NH)	2	1	17	0.00%	0.00%	0.05%
Other race alone (NH)	32	39	119	0.10%	0.12%	0.39%
Mixed race or Multiracial (NH)	303	419	1,356	1.02%	1.34%	4.48%
Hispanic or Latino (any race)	201	331	605	0.67%	1.05%	2.00%
Total	29,702	31,227	30,233	100.00%	100.00%	100.00%

=== 2010 census ===
As of the 2010 United States census, there were 31,227 people, 12,553 households, and 8,153 families residing in the county. The population density was 48.1 inhabitants per square mile (18.6/km^{2}). There were 15,942 housing units at an average density of 24.6 per square mile (9.5/km^{2}). Of the 12,553 households, 29.4% had children under the age of 18 living with them, 49.7% were married couples living together, 10.1% had a female householder with no husband present, 35.1% were non-families, and 27.5% of all households were made up of individuals. The average household size was 2.38 and the average family size was 2.86. The median age was 42.1 years.

The median income for a household in the county was $42,706 and the median income for a family was $51,503. Males had a median income of $40,223 versus $30,707 for females. The per capita income for the county was $22,504. About 9.6% of families and 13.5% of the population were below the poverty line, including 15.6% of those under age 18 and 13.0% of those age 65 or over.

== Government ==
As in all Vermont counties, there is a small executive function which is mostly consolidated at the state level. Remaining county government is judicial. There are no "county taxes".

In 2007, median property taxes in the county were $2,278, placing it 265 out of 1,817 counties in the nation with populations over 20,000.

=== Parties Organized in Caledonia County ===
Party	Office	Name	Town
Democratic Party	Chair	Issiah Willson	Saint Johnsbury
	Vice	Bruce Maclean	Peacham
	Treasurer	Marion Mohri	Saint Johnsbury
Progressive Party	Chair	Chris Brimmer	Ryegate
Republican Party	Chair	Not Public	Not Public
	Treasurer	Steve Dolgin	Saint Johnsbury

The elected officials of the county are as follows:

Position	Name	Party	First elected
State Senator	Joe Benning	Republican	2010
State Senator	M. Jane Kitchel	Dem/Rep	2004
State Rep District 1	Marcia R. Martel	Republican	2014
State Rep District 2	Chip Troiano	Democratic	2014
State Rep District 3	Scott Beck	Republican	2014
State Rep District 3	Scott Campbell	Dem/Prog	2018
State Rep District 4	Martha Feltus	Republican	2012
State Rep District 4	Patrick Seymour	Rep/Dem	2018
State Rep District Cal-Wash	Catherine Beattie Toll	Democratic	2008
State's Attorney	Claire Burns	Republican	2025
Assistant Judge	John S. Hall	Democratic	2014
Assistant Judge	Roy C. Vance	Dem/Rep	2006
Probate Judge	William W. Cobb	Democratic	2018
Sheriff	James Hemond	Dem/Rep	2022
High Bailiff	Robert Gerrish	Republican	2022
Justices of the Peace:

Justices of the Peace

Current composition of justices.

Town	Name	Party	First elected
Barnet; 7	Steven Adler	Democratic	2014
Barnet; 7	Susan Coppenrath	Democratic	2012
Barnet; 7	William Graves	Independent	2002
Barnet; 7	Susan Jensen	Republican	2008
Barnet; 7	Dennis Mclam	Republican	2010
Barnet; 7	Stanley Robinson	Independent	2004
Barnet; 7	Shellie Samuels	Democratic	2014
Burke; 7	Susan Carr	Republican	2014
Burke; 7	Cathleen Feeley	Independent	2004
Burke; 7	Joel Gilbert	Democratic	2012
Burke; 7	William David Hammond	Independent	2018
Burke; 7	Joan Harlowe	Democratic	2008
Burke; 7	Christian Bradley Hubbs	Progressive	2018
Burke; 7	John Kascenska	Republican	2018
Danville; 10	Eric Bach	Democratic	2016
Danville; 10	Ted Houle	Independent	2012
Danville; 10	Virginia Incerpi	Republican	2008
Danville; 10	Jane Larrabee	Republican	2004
Danville; 10	Julie Larrabee	Republican	2006
Danville; 10	Justin Lavely	Democratic	2014
Danville; 10	Kenneth Linsley	Republican	2016
Danville; 10	Bruce Melendy	Republican	2012
Danville; 10	Lindsey Mitchell	Democratic	2014
Danville; 10	Phyllis Kehley Sweeney	Democratic	2010
Groton; 7	Timothy Daily Sr	Democratic	2008
Groton; 7	Tirone Dyer	Democratic	2016
Groton; 7	Deborah Jurist	Democratic	2010
Groton; 7	Dorothy Knott	Republican	2014
Groton; 7	Linda Nunn	Democratic	2012
Groton; 7	Carrie Peters	Democratic	2014
Groton; 7	Brent Smith	Republican	2012
Hardwick; 10	Donna Casavant	Democratic	2012
Hardwick; 10	James Casavant	Democratic	2008
Hardwick; 10	Bradley Ferland	Independent	2010
Hardwick; 10	Jean Hackett	Democratic	2012
Hardwick; 10	Bill Hill	Republican	2004
Hardwick; 10	Robin Leslie	Democratic	2018
Hardwick; 10	Tracy Martin	Republican	2016
Hardwick; 10	Allan Michaud	Democratic	2012
Hardwick; 10	Lenore Renaud	Democratic	2006
Hardwick; 10	George Whitney	Republican	2010
Kirby; 5	David Emery	Democratic	2012
Kirby; 5	Anne Mclaughry	Democratic	2008
Kirby; 5	Karen Moore	Republican	2014
Kirby; 5	Timothy Peters	Democratic	2016
Kirby; 5	Vacant	n/a	
Lyndon; 15	Joe Benning	Republican	2008
Lyndon; 15	Catherine M. Boykin	Democratic	2010
Lyndon; 15	Edith Bell Brown	Democratic	1996
Lyndon; 15	Kevin Calkins	Republican	2004
Lyndon; 15	Michael Codding	Republican	2012
Lyndon; 15	Dan Daley	Democratic	2016
Lyndon; 15	Libre E. Drouin	Democratic	2016
Lyndon; 15	Reed Garfield	Republican	2018
Lyndon; 15	Kathy M. Gray	Democratic	2012
Lyndon; 15	Oralie Lefaivre	Republican	2014
Lyndon; 15	Ken Mason	Republican	2014
Lyndon; 15	Sean R. Mcfeeley	Democratic	2016
Lyndon; 15	Brenda J. Mitchell	Republican	2010
Lyndon; 15	Beth Quimby	Republican	2002
Lyndon; 15	Sara J. Simpson	Democratic	2012
Newark; 5	John Findlay	Independent	2008
Newark; 5	Elizabeth Grout	Republican	2010
Newark; 5	Sarah Newell	Independent	2016
Newark; 5	Mary Ann Riggie	Republican	2012
Newark; 5	Laura Rodger	Independent	2010
Peacham; 5	Jean Dedam	Democratic	2014
Peacham; 5	Cynthia Greene	Democratic	2010
Peacham; 5	Eric Kaufman	Democratic	2014
Peacham; 5	Samuel Kempton	Democratic	2006
Peacham; 5	Diana Senturia	Democratic	2012
Ryegate; 7	Todd Colby	Republican	2014
Ryegate; 7	Katherine Davie	Democratic	2016
Ryegate; 7	Michael Murray	Republican	2018
Ryegate; 7	Darcy Nelson	Republican	2008
Ryegate; 7	Jennifer R. Nelson	Democratic	2010
Ryegate; 7	Nancy Perkins	Democratic	2006
Ryegate; 7	Robert Rowden	Republican	2018
Sheffield; 5	Barbara Bristol	Independent	2012
Sheffield; 5	Gay Ellis	Republican	2010
Sheffield; 5	Leslie Ham	Democratic	2016
Sheffield; 5	Dorothy Scofield	Democratic	2008
Sheffield; 5	Sally Woodsimons	Republican	2018
St. Johnsbury; 15	Pierre Berube	Republican	2006
St. Johnsbury; 15	Mark Bickford	Independent	2000
St. Johnsbury; 15	David Brown	Republican	2012
St. Johnsbury; 15	Stephanie Churchill	Democratic	2014
St. Johnsbury; 15	Anne Cosgrove	Democratic	2010
St. Johnsbury; 15	Albert Dunn	Republican	2012
St. Johnsbury; 15	Conrad Doyon	Democratic	2014
St. Johnsbury; 15	Durward Ellis	Republican	1998
St. Johnsbury; 15	John Goodrich	Republican	2008
St. Johnsbury; 15	Gretchen Hammer	Republican	2006
St. Johnsbury; 15	Diane Holmes	Republican	2016
St. Johnsbury; 15	Kevin Oddy	Democratic	2012
St. Johnsbury; 15	Abby Pollender	Democratic	2018
St. Johnsbury; 15	Lisa Rivers	Democratic	2008
St. Johnsbury; 15	Milton Rivers	Democratic	2004
Stannard; 5	Christine Foster	Independent	2006
Stannard; 5	Joseph Gresser	Independent	2012
Stannard; 5	John Reynolds	Independent	1988
Stannard; 5	Evelyn Rich	Democratic	2016
Stannard; 5	Chip Troiano	Democratic	2010
Sutton; 5	Marlin Devenger	Independent	2012
Sutton; 5	Danielle Fortin	Republican	2012
Sutton; 5	Celeste Girrell	Democratic	2008
Sutton; 5	Alan Seymour	Republican	2014
Sutton; 5	Patrick Seymour	Independent	2016
Walden; 5	Diane Cochran	Republican	2014
Walden; 5	Michael Coffey	Democratic	2016
Walden; 5	Annette Foster	Independent	2010
Walden; 5	Roger Fox	Republican	2014
Walden; 5	P. Ann Gaillard	Republican	2012
Waterford; 7	Brent Beck	Republican	2010
Waterford; 7	Kevin Gillander	Republican	2018
Waterford; 7	Charles Lawrence	Republican	2008
Waterford; 7	David E. Morrison	Republican	2018
Waterford; 7	William Piper	Independent	2006
Waterford; 7	Marcia R. Martel	Republican	2010
Waterford; 7	Bernard Willey	Republican	2014
Wheelock; 5	Stephen Amos	Democratic	2002
Wheelock; 5	Eileen Boland	Democratic	2012
Wheelock; 5	Kimberly Cradysmith	Republican	2010
Wheelock; 5	Peter Miller	Republican	2018
Wheelock; 5	Carol Rossi	Democratic	2014

=== Elections ===
In 1828, Caledonia County voted for National Republican Party candidate John Quincy Adams.

In 1832, the county was won by Anti-Masonic Party candidate William Wirt.

From William Henry Harrison in 1836 to Winfield Scott in 1852, the county would vote the Whig Party candidates.

From John C. Frémont in 1856 to Richard Nixon in 1960 (barring 1912, where the county was won by Progressive Party candidate and former president Theodore Roosevelt), the Republican Party would have a 104-year winning streak in the county.

In 1964, the county was won by Democratic Party incumbent President Lyndon B. Johnson, who became not only the first Democratic presidential candidate to win the county, but to win the state of Vermont entirely.

Following the Democrats' victory in 1964, the county went back to voting for Republican candidates for another 20 year winning streak starting with Richard Nixon in 1968 and ending with George H. W. Bush in 1988.

The county would be won by Bill Clinton in both the 1992 and 1996 presidential elections.

George W. Bush would win the county in 2000 and would be the last time a Republican presidential candidate would carry the county.

John Kerry won the county in 2004 and it has been won by Democratic candidates ever since.

United States presidential election results for Caledonia County, Vermont
Year	Republican		Democratic		Third party(ies)	
Year	No.	%	No.	%	No.	%
1880	3,134	69.11%	1,372	30.25%	29	0.64%
1884	2,639	61.99%	1,314	30.87%	304	7.14%
1888	3,083	65.82%	1,249	26.67%	352	7.51%
1892	2,646	65.24%	1,222	30.13%	188	4.64%
1896	3,474	78.65%	729	16.50%	214	4.84%
1900	2,957	76.79%	817	21.22%	77	2.00%
1904	2,944	81.53%	580	16.06%	87	2.41%
1908	2,700	74.63%	764	21.12%	154	4.26%
1912	1,583	32.86%	1,065	22.11%	2,169	45.03%
1916	3,024	60.44%	1,887	37.72%	92	1.84%
1920	5,537	75.85%	1,694	23.21%	69	0.95%
1924	6,205	83.60%	929	12.52%	288	3.88%
1928	6,616	78.07%	1,832	21.62%	26	0.31%
1932	6,066	62.27%	3,621	37.17%	54	0.55%
1936	6,054	64.25%	3,342	35.47%	27	0.29%
1940	5,793	62.56%	3,444	37.19%	23	0.25%
1944	5,086	64.46%	2,804	35.54%	0	0.00%
1948	5,873	68.75%	2,585	30.26%	84	0.98%
1952	7,595	80.60%	1,807	19.18%	21	0.22%
1956	7,560	81.26%	1,744	18.74%	0	0.00%
1960	6,688	69.69%	2,909	30.31%	0	0.00%
1964	3,258	36.24%	5,732	63.76%	0	0.00%
1968	4,996	58.88%	3,201	37.73%	288	3.39%
1972	6,762	68.04%	3,094	31.13%	83	0.84%
1976	5,488	59.63%	3,511	38.15%	204	2.22%
1980	5,986	56.88%	3,284	31.21%	1,253	11.91%
1984	7,249	68.32%	3,223	30.38%	138	1.30%
1988	6,915	61.13%	4,251	37.58%	146	1.29%
1992	4,571	34.99%	4,948	37.88%	3,543	27.12%
1996	4,089	34.66%	5,593	47.40%	2,117	17.94%
2000	6,746	49.45%	5,859	42.95%	1,036	7.59%
2004	6,765	47.60%	7,106	50.00%	340	2.39%
2008	5,472	37.15%	8,900	60.43%	356	2.42%
2012	5,088	37.24%	8,192	59.97%	381	2.79%
2016	5,534	39.32%	6,445	45.79%	2,095	14.89%
2020	6,551	40.52%	9,011	55.73%	607	3.75%
2024	6,927	41.65%	8,977	53.97%	729	4.38%

== Transportation ==
=== Airport ===
The Caledonia County Airport is located in Lyndon, Vermont.

=== Major highways ===
- Interstate 91
- Interstate 93
- U.S. Route 2
- U.S. Route 5
- U.S. Route 302

== Communities ==
=== Towns ===
- Barnet
- Burke
- Danville
- Groton
- Hardwick
- Kirby
- Lyndon
- Newark
- Peacham
- Ryegate
- Sheffield
- St. Johnsbury (shire town)
- Stannard
- Sutton
- Walden
- Waterford
- Wheelock

=== Villages ===
Incorporated villages are census divisions and provide additional services. They remain part of the towns they are in. Cities are formed when villages become large enough to warrant greater governmental organization, and become separate from the surrounding town.

- Burke Hollow – unincorporated village of Burke
- East Hardwick – unincorporated village of Hardwick
- East Lyndon – unincorporated village of Lyndon
- East Ryegate – unincorporated village of Ryegate
- East St. Johnsbury – unincorporated village of St. Johnsbury
- Lower Waterford – unincorporated village of Waterford
- Lyndon Corner – unincorporated village of Lyndon; corresponds to the Lyndon census-designated place
- Lyndonville – incorporated village of Lyndon
- Mackville – unincorporated village of Hardwick
- McIndoe Falls – unincorporated village of Barnet
- Passumpsic – unincorporated village of Barnet
- Ryegate Corner – unincorporated village of Ryegate
- South Kirby – unincorporated village of Kirby
- South Ryegate – unincorporated village of Ryegate
- St. Johnsbury Center – unincorporated village of St. Johnsbury
- Upper Waterford – unincorporated village of Waterford
- West Burke – incorporated village of Burke

=== Census-designated places ===
- Barnet
- Danville
- East Burke
- Groton
- Hardwick
- Lyndon
- Lyndon Center
- Peacham
- Sheffield
- St. Johnsbury
- Sutton

== Notable people ==
- Anne Morrow Lindbergh died in Passumpsic in 2001.

== See also ==
- Historical U.S. Census totals for Caledonia County, Vermont
- National Register of Historic Places listings in Caledonia County, Vermont
