= Wheelock, Vermont =

- Town
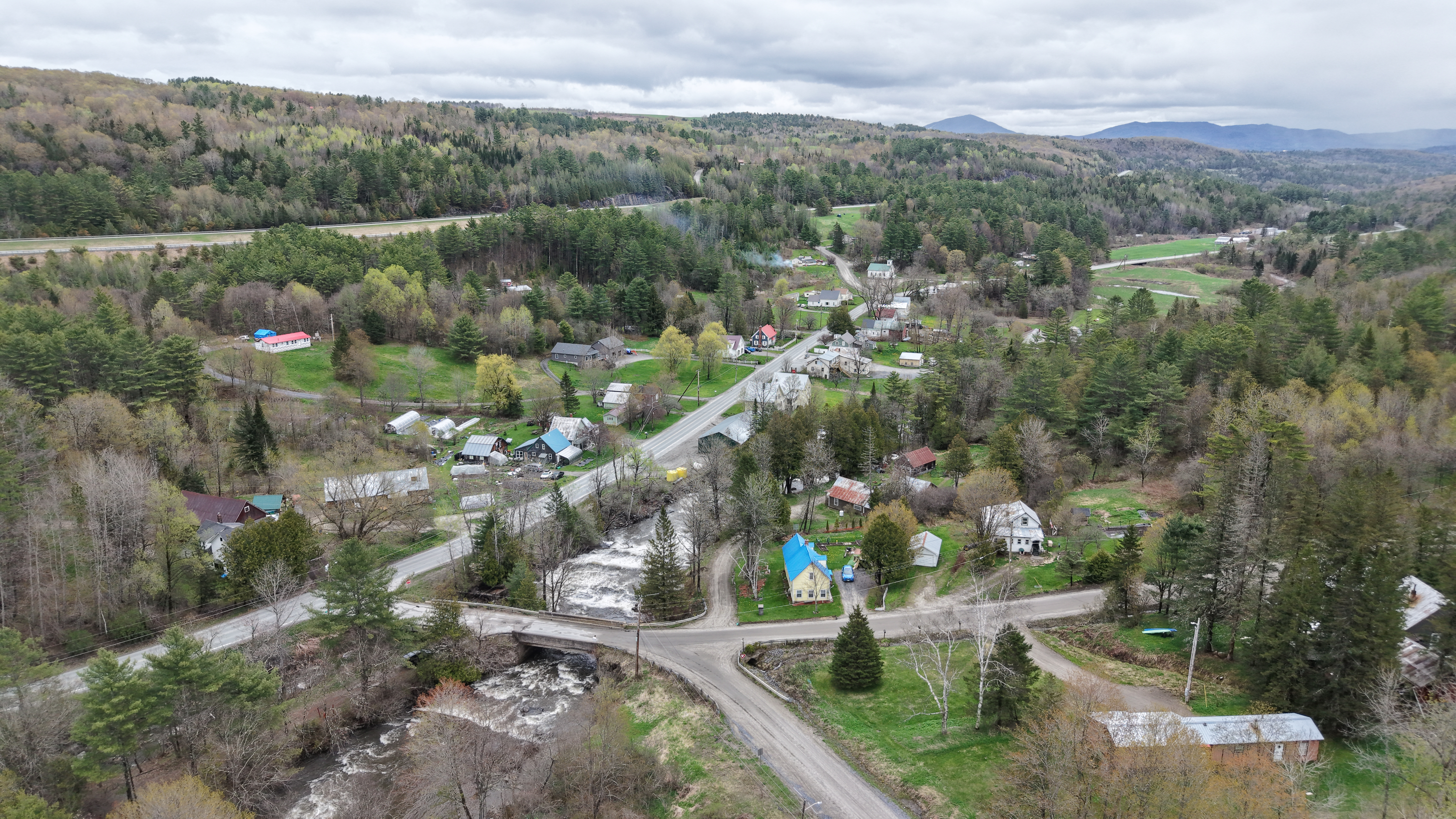
- Wheelock, Vermont, from the northwest

- Logo

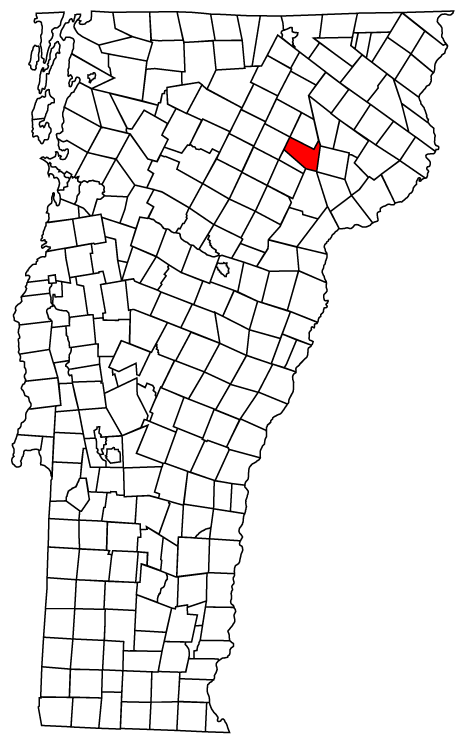
- Wheelock, Vermont
- Coordinates: 44°33′52″N 72°06′52″W
- Country: United States
- State: Vermont
- County: Caledonia
- Chartered: November 8, 1780

Area
  - Total: 39.8 sq mi (103.1 km^{2})
  - Land: 39.5 sq mi (102.3 km^{2})
  - Water: 0.31 sq mi (0.8 km^{2})
- Elevation: 1,729 ft (527 m)

Population (2020)
  - Total: 759
  - Density: 19/sq mi (7.4/km^{2})
- Time zone: UTC-5 (Eastern (EST))
  - Summer (DST): UTC-4 (EDT)
- ZIP Codes: 05851 (Lyndonville); 05866 (Sheffield); 05842 (Greensboro Bend)
- Area code: 802
- FIPS code: 50-83500
- GNIS feature ID: 1462259
- Website: townofwheelockvt.org

Wheelock is a town in Caledonia County, Vermont, United States. The population was 759 at the 2020 census.

== History ==
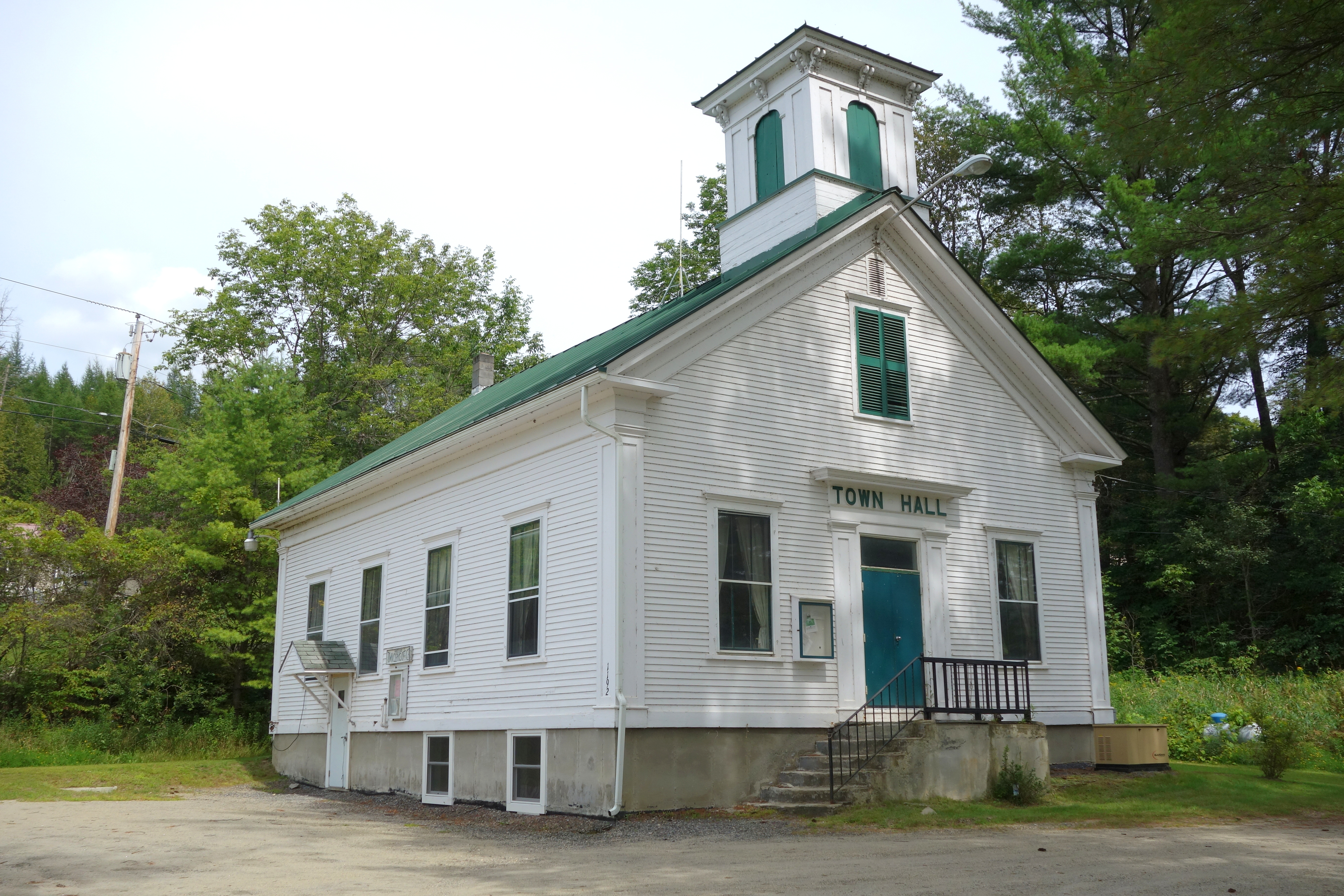
Wheelock Town Hall

The town was named after Eleazar Wheelock, the founder of Dartmouth College. Through a provision of the college dating to c. 1830, any full-time resident of Wheelock who is accepted as an undergraduate at Dartmouth College may attend the school entirely free of tuition. Between the 1890s and 2025, ten Wheelock Scholars attended Dartmouth College.

Standing in the center of the village for many years was the old brick hotel, known as the Caledonia Spring House. In 1893, Myron D. Park, who served four years as a Wheelock selectman, sold the Caledonia Spring House to Marshall Way. The hotel was the site of a notorious murder on May 20, 1896, when owner Marshall Way killed his 44-year-old wife, Ellen Sheldon Way, in the dooryard. According to the St. Johnsbury Caledonian of May 22, 1896, "The little town of Wheelock was thrown into a state of wild excitement last Wednesday evening when the cry went around that Marshall Way had killed his wife. It was a terrible shock to the people of the quiet town, and it may be many days before they recover sufficiently to converse to any length upon another subject."

After the murder, the Caledonia Spring House was sold to Alden J. Rennie, owner of several mills in Sutton, Sheffield, and Wheelock. The building was dismantled during the 1990s after falling into disrepair. It was moved to Peacham where it is being restored on private property.

Eleazar Wheelock's grandson founded Wheelock, Texas in the early 1800s and named it after the original town in Vermont.

== Geography ==
Wheelock is located in northwestern Caledonia County and is bordered by the town of Sheffield to the north, Sutton to the northeast, Lyndon to the east, Danville to the south, Stannard to the southwest, and Greensboro to the west. According to the United States Census Bureau, the town has a total area of 39.8 square miles (103.1 km^{2}), of which 39.5 square miles (102.3 km^{2}) is land and 0.31 square miles (0.8 km^{2}), or 0.80%, is water.

The highest point in town is Wheelock Mountain, with an elevation of 2,782 feet (848 m).

== Demographics ==
Historical population
Census	Pop.	Note	%±
1790	33		—
1800	568		1,621.2%
1810	964		69.7%
1820	906		−6.0%
1830	834		−7.9%
1840	881		5.6%
1850	855		−3.0%
1860	832		−2.7%
1870	822		−1.2%
1880	829		0.9%
1890	596		−28.1%
1900	567		−4.9%
1910	500		−11.8%
1920	526		5.2%
1930	412		−21.7%
1940	293		−28.9%
1950	287		−2.0%
1960	246		−14.3%
1970	238		−3.3%
1980	444		86.6%
1990	481		8.3%
2000	621		29.1%
2010	811		30.6%
2020	759		−6.4%
U.S. Decennial Census

As of the census of 2000, there were 621 people, 238 households, and 178 families residing in the town. The population density was 15.7 people per square mile (6.1/km^{2}). There were 321 housing units at an average density of 8.1 per square mile (3.1/km^{2}). The racial makeup of the town was 97.58% White, 0.32% Native American, 0.16% Asian, 1.29% from other races, and 0.64% from two or more races.

There were 238 households, out of which 32.4% had children under the age of 18 living with them, 64.3% were married couples living together, 5.9% had a female householder with no husband present, and 24.8% were non-families. 19.3% of all households were made up of individuals, and 7.1% had someone living alone who was 65 years of age or older. The average household size was 2.61 and the average family size was 2.96.

In the town, the population was spread out, with 25.9% under the age of 18, 6.0% from 18 to 24, 28.0% from 25 to 44, 30.4% from 45 to 64, and 9.7% who were 65 years of age or older. The median age was 40 years. For every 100 females, there were 98.4 males. For every 100 females age 18 and over, there were 100.0 males.

The median income for a household in the town was $35,750, and the median income for a family was $40,625. Males had a median income of $30,417 versus $21,667 for females. The per capita income for the town was $15,440. About 4.9% of families and 8.2% of the population were below the poverty line, including 7.4% of those under age 18 and 18.3% of those age 65 or over.

== Notable people ==
- Augustine Clarke (c. 1780–1841), Anti-Masonic Party leader and Vermont State Treasurer
- Erastus Fairbanks (1792–1864), Governor of Vermont
- William H. Taylor, Associate Justice of the Vermont Supreme Court
- Josiah Willard (1805–1868), author and father of Frances Willard
