= Passumpsic River =

River in Vermont, United States

Coordinates: 44°19′14″N 72°01′56″W

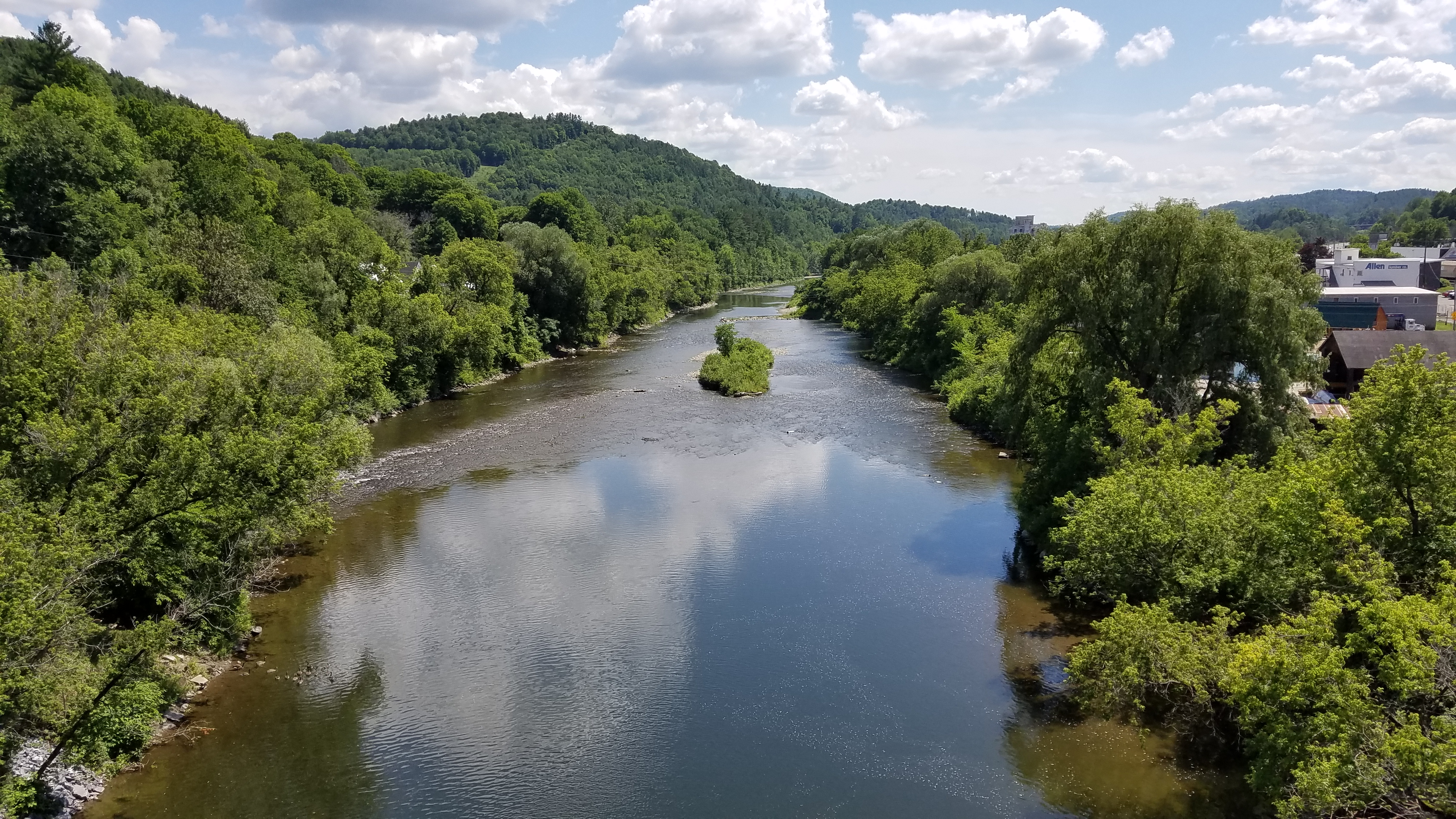
- The river from the Portland Street Bridge in Saint Johnsbury

Location
- Country: United States

Physical characteristics
- Source
  - location: Main stem: Lyndonville, VT; West Branch: Westmore, VTEast Branch: Brighton, VT
  - elevation: Main stem 699 feet (213 m), West Branch 968 feet (295 m), East Branch 1,010 feet (310 m)
- Mouth
  - location: Connecticut River at Nine Island near East Barnet, VT
  - elevation: 469 feet (143 m)
- Length: Main stem 22.7 miles (36.5 km), West Branch 15.3 miles (24.6 km), East Branch 19.5 miles (31.4 km)
- Basin size: 436 mi^{2} (1,130 km^{2})

The Passumpsic River (/pəˈsʌmpsɪk/) is a 22.7-mile-long (36.5 km) tributary of the Connecticut River, in Vermont. Though primarily a Caledonia County river, it is the only river to flow through all three counties of the Northeast Kingdom.

== Course ==
The Passumpsic River charted in 1875

The river arises in two branches: east and west. The East Branch begins just north of East Haven. It flows southwest through Hartwellville in East Haven, then into East Burke.

The West Branch starts as several small forks in Westmore. The Montreal, Maine and Atlantic Railway lines follows the West Branch of the Passumpsic from West Burke until it converges with the East Branch in Lyndonville.

From Lyndonville, the river proceeds southerly through St. Johnsbury Center, St. Johnsbury, Passumpsic, and Barnet, and into the Connecticut River near Nine Island.

=== East Branch ===
The East Branch originates about 1/2 mile southeast of Sukes Pond, Brighton, in Essex County. Route 114 nearly parallels it as it runs south-southeast. It soon enters Caledonia County. It is joined by Jack Brook near Howard Brook Road in Newark. It then turns south southwest.

Just before entering East Haven, it is joined by Mill Brook/King Brook entering from the east. It is then joined by the confluence of Bean Brook and Whetstone Brook just inside the town of East Haven, back in Essex County. It goes through Hartwellville, in the town of East Haven, then crosses into Caledonia County for good.

In Burke, a mile downstream, it is joined on the south by Flower Brook which flows mainly from the east. Duck Pond drains into it. It is followed by Route 5A and flows through East Burke. It converges with the west branch before 5A joins US Route 5.

=== West Branch ===
The West Branch first exits out the west side of Newark Pond in Newark. It flows briefly through Barton, back into Newark, then into Burke.

=== Burke Mountain ===
The northeast and northwest sides of Burke Mountain drain into Dish Mill Brook, thence into the East Branch of the Passumpsic River. The southwest end of Burke Mountain drains into Mountain Brook, thence into the East Branch of the Passumpsic River. The south slopes and southeast side of Burke Mountain drain into Weir Mill Brook, thence into Bog Brook, the Moose River, and the Passumpsic River.

==== Burke ====
It proceeds south-southwest. Arcadia Brook flows into it from the north near Arcadia Lane. West Brook flows into it from the northwest near VT 5A, which nearly parallels it from then on south. The river flows south from that point. After it crosses 5A going south southwest, another unnamed brook enters it from the east

Sutton River enters it from the southwest, near U.S. Route 5 at West Burke. Route 5 now nearly parallels it southbound. The river then turns south-southeast. An unnamed brook, which Brook Road parallels for a while, enters from the east.

==== Lyndon (west branch only) ====
In Lyndon it passes through Folsom Village. Quimby and Calendar brooks enter from the west. The river turns south, near the Calendar Brook Road intersection with Route 5. The two branches merge near East Burke Road, just northeast of where VT 114 intersects with US 5.

=== Lyndon (after two branches merge) ===
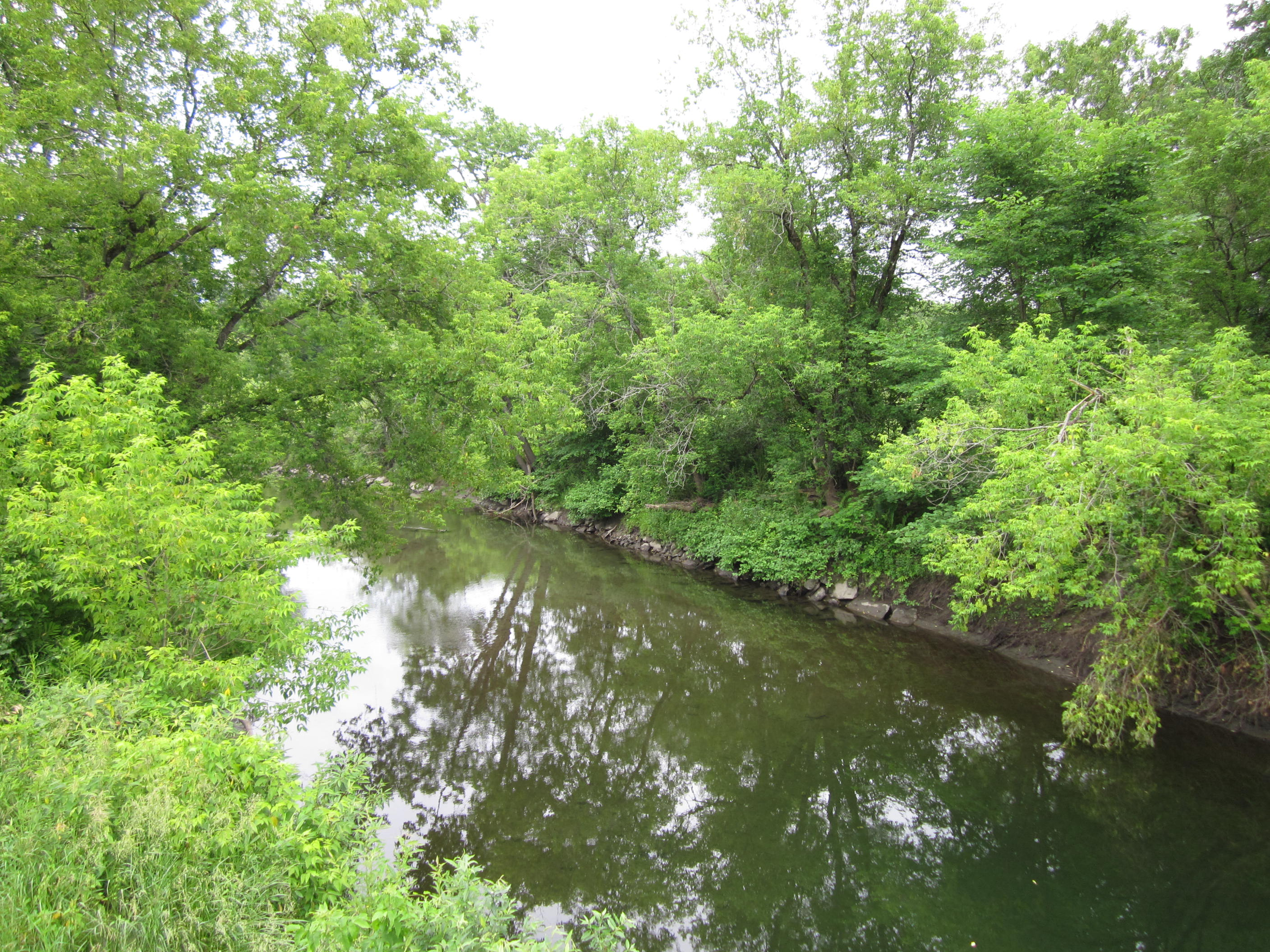
Passumpsic River near Lyndonville, Vermont

The joined river continues south. The river turns west, even west-northwest at times. An unnamed brook enters from the north. The river turns south. Miller Run enters from the west. Miller Run Valley is a sufficiently prominent feature to be followed by Interstate 91 instead of Route 5. South Wheelock Branch enters from the west southwest just south of Riverside Court. The river proceeds to the Route 5 bridge and from there to the Vail Hydro Dam. The river runs southeast, then takes a turn west northwest, as the Sheldon River enters from the east.

The river encounters the Vail Hydro Dam and runs to a gravel pit. The Little Falls, about a mile above the Great Falls, have about a 20-foot (6.1 m) descent. The river proceeds from the gravel pit and railroad tracks to the Great Falls Dam downstream. It briefly widens to pond size south of Murray Circle.

It encounters the Great Falls Dam and runs downstream to the St. Johnsbury Pierce Mills Dam. Roberts Brook enters from the east. Stark Brook enters from the north and west, north of St. Johnsbury Center. A second Roberts Brook enters from the east. A third Roberts Brook enters from the west.

=== St. Johnsbury ===
The river proceeds through the center of St. Johnsbury from north to south. From its valley the higher lands rise on either side to the east and west. In the southern part of the town it is joined by the Moose River at St. Johnsbury, a large stream from the east, and the Sleepers River, a smaller tributary, from the northwest.

It encounters the Pierce Mills Hydro Dam. It proceeds to the Rapids after a sharp bend downstream across from the Green Mountain Trailer Park above the mall at St. Johnsbury Center. Across from the Green Mountain Trailer Park, it flows downstream to the Price Chopper store on the corner where river and the railroad come close together.

From here it flows downstream to the confluence of the Moose River. It noticeably widens here after merging coming from the west. The river is often 100-200 wide as it runs south from here on. The Sleepers River runs into it. Next downstream is the Gage Hydro Dam.

=== Waterford ===
The Passumpsic flows through the western corner of the town from the Gage Hydro Dam downstream to the Passumpsic Hydro Dam.

=== Barnet ===
The Passumpsic River (left) joining the Connecticut River (right), viewed from the south

The river enters from St. Johnsbury through the corner of Waterford, in the northeastern part, and gradually turns and flows south, emptying into the Connecticut about 2.5 miles (4.0 km) from the northeastern corner of the town.

It encounters Enerick Brook which comes from Danville and enters the Passumpsic about 1 mile (1.6 km) above the mouth of Joes Brook. Joes Brook comes from Joes Pond in Danville and flows in a southeasterly direction through the town, and enters the Passumpsic about 1.5 miles (2.4 km) from its mouth. Next it encounters Pass Hydro.

Water Andric enters from the west and south just north of Kitchell Hill. Joes Brook flows into it. Next the river flows through East Barnet Hydro. Joes Brook enters it from the south and west just north of Barnet Center.

It flows through East Barnet Hydro downstream to where the Passumpsic enters the Connecticut River from Barnet, about 1 mile (1.6 km) west of the Comerford Dam.

== Geology ==
The Passumpsic Valley esker is the longest in Vermont and New Hampshire, if not in all of New England. It extends from St. Johnsbury northward past Lyndonville, where it splits into two branches, one extending up the valley of the Sutton River to West Burke and the other extending on up the Passumpsic River valley to East Haven. In some places it is over 150 feet (46 m) thick and two or three hundred feet wide.

Based on research by Edward Hitchcock two or three basins can be identified based on a larger number of interconnected terraces in the Passumpsic River Valley.

The first extends from the mouth of the Passumpsic River in Barnet, to the northwest corner of the town of Waterford, on the railroad. It is about 4 miles (6.4 km) long. The river runs through a narrow valley in Barnet, a gorge with no terraces. Narrow terraces in the Town of Passumpsic expand and form a basin. The fourth terrace on the west side of the river is part of the next basin, which is in St. Johnsbury and Lyndon. St. Johnsbury Village is on this high terrace which is called "St. Johnsbury Plain". The base of the terraces at St. Johnsbury is composed of clay. The same terrace occurs on both sides of the river valley beyond Lyndon. There are lower terraces at intervals.

Lyndonville has a high terrace. This may have once extended across the valley to form the end of a basin. Its lower strata are clayey, and are folded and curved. West of this terrace the level is lower. There is the course of a former river bed which ran towards the east. At the upper village of Lyndon the first terrace is about 1 mile (1.6 km) wide. There is a lot of sand and fine gravel adjoining.

Every stream from either side of the valley has its large terraces to correspond with those of the Passumpsic River. It is a characteristic of these terraces that they are large while their quantity is small. The count never exceeds five which is unusual.

The third basin includes the east branch of the Passumpsic River which runs through the Town of Burke. In East Burke there are several terraces. Near the village there are four on the west side, and two on the east side. Above East Burke the valley rises so that its bottom appears like a terrace. Its steep slope crosses the valley at right angles. There are indistinct terraces on its sides. Since the valley seems to be too wide to correspond with the size of the river, the valley may have been formed by water from unknown sources in prehistoric times.

== Hydroelectric power ==
The Passumpsic River sustains several dams that produce hydroelectric power for the region. Central Vermont Public Service (CVPS), operates the Passumpsic, Pierce Mills, Arnold Falls, and Gage dams. Great Falls Dam and Vail Dam are locally owned by the town of Lyndonville, VT. In 2006, the Passumpsic Valley Land Trust was given a grant by the federal government to remove the East Burke Dam from the eastern branch of the Passumpsic.

== History ==
Major Rogers led his rangers to the mouth of the Passumpsic on their retreat from the attack on the Abenaki Indians at St. Francis, Quebec in 1759. Coming south, they had split up into three groups with one following the Passumpsic River Valley south.

== Popular and official references ==
H.P. Lovecraft refers to the river in his horror short story The Whisperer in Darkness as a river in which unusual bodies were seen floating after the heavy Vermont floods of 1927.

One United States Navy ship has been named for the river. USS Passumpsic (AO-107) was an oiler that served in commission in the U.S. Navy from 1946 to 1973. She then decommissioned, transferred to the Military Sealift Command, was redesignated USNS Passumpsic (T-AO-107), and continued to serve in support of the U.S. Navy with a civilian crew as a United States Naval Ship until 1991.

== See also ==
- List of rivers of Vermont
