= U.S. Route 5 in Vermont =

Segment of American highway

U.S. Route 5
- Calvin Coolidge Memorial Highway
- US 5 highlighted in red

Route information
- Maintained by VTrans
- Length: 192.317 mi (309.504 km)
- Existed: 1926–present

Major junctions
- South end: US 5 at the Massachusetts state line in Guilford
- US 4 in Hartford; US 302 in Newbury; US 2 in St. Johnsbury
- North end: R-143 at the Canadian border in Derby Line

Location
- Country: United States
- State: Vermont
- Counties: Windham, Windsor, Orange, Caledonia, Orleans

Highway system
- United States Numbered Highway System; List; Special; Divided; State highways in Vermont
← US 4	→ VT 5A

U.S. Route 5 (US 5) is a part of the United States Numbered Highway System that runs from New Haven, Connecticut, to the Canada–United States border at Derby Line, Vermont. In Vermont, the road runs south–north from the Massachusetts state line near Guilford to the international border. The 192.317 miles (309.504 km) that lie in Vermont are maintained by the Vermont Agency of Transportation (VTrans) and run largely parallel to Interstate 91 (I-91). US 5 also follows the path of the Connecticut River from the Massachusetts border to St. Johnsbury, where the river turns northeast while US 5 continues north. The highway serves the major towns of Brattleboro, Hartford, and St. Johnsbury, along with the city of Newport near the Canadian border.

Before the development of the Numbered Highway System, US 5 was designated Route 2 and was part of the New England road marking system that existed from 1922 to 1927. When the highway system was formed in November 1926, the former Route 2 was commissioned as US 5. At this point, the road was not paved. It was not paved until the state of Vermont started overseeing the maintenance of the highway in 1931. The road was completely paved by 1933.

== Route description ==
US 5 winds through the far eastern part of Vermont, passing through many small towns and villages. The road runs through a fairly rural, wooded area throughout much of its path in Vermont.

=== Southern Vermont ===
US 5 enters the southern end of Vermont in Windham County at the Massachusetts–Vermont state line just north of Bernardston and just south of Guilford. The route is known as the Calvin Coolidge Memorial Highway from the Massachusetts border to the junction of Vermont Route 103 (VT 103) in Rockingham. The road winds through wooded land along the west side of I-91 for its first eight miles (13 km) in Vermont. In Brattleboro, Vermont's fourth-largest town, US 5 crosses under the Interstate and winds through Brattleboro's business district. US 5 also starts a brief concurrency with VT 9 that continues for 2.3 miles (3.7 km). North of Brattleboro, after VT 9 turns east, US 5 crosses back over the Interstate to the west side.

US 5 continues north from Brattleboro, passing near the small towns of Dummerston and Putney. North of Putney, it crosses over I-91 to serve the towns of Westminster, Bellows Falls, and Rockingham. Near Rockingham, US 5 intersects VT 103, which picks up the Calvin Coolidge Memorial Highway. US 5 continues north on the east side of the Interstate, crossing into Windsor County, for 6.6 miles (10.6 km) to Springfield, where it crosses to the west side for just under a mile (1.6 km). Here, it picks up a 0.8-mile (1.3 km) concurrency with VT 11 and US 5 crosses back to the east side of I-91 with VT 11.

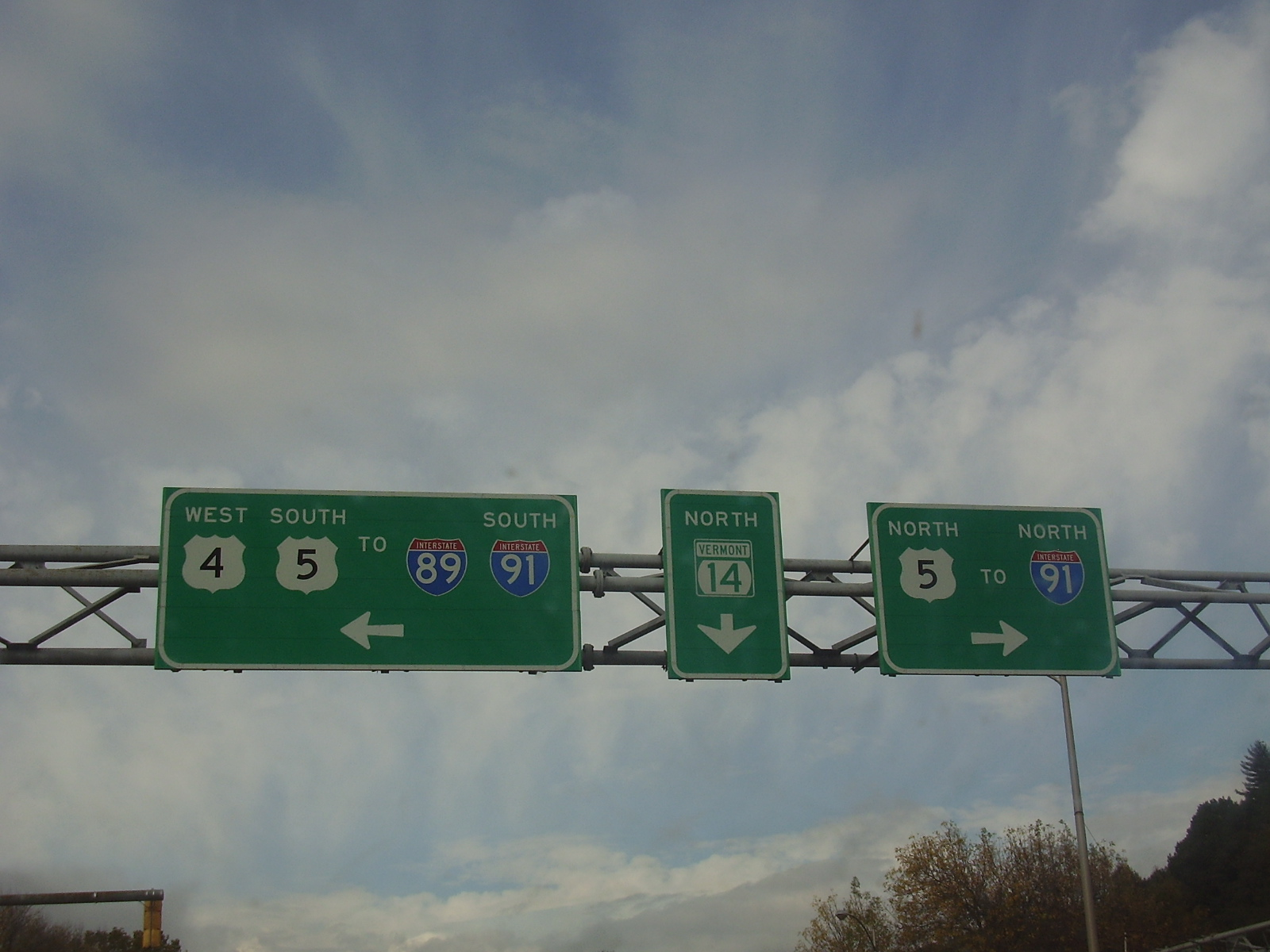
Sign at junction of US 4, US 5, and VT 14 in White River Junction

US 5 continues along the east side of I-91 for 20 miles (32 km) after its concurrency with VT 11. Along this stretch, US 5 passes through Wilgus State Park in Ascutney and the town of Windsor. In Ascutney, US 5 picks up VT 12 for a 10-mile-long (16 km) concurrency. VT 12 winds along with US 5 through Windsor and across the Interstate to Hartland, where it turns northwest away from US 5. North of Hartland, US 5 crosses under I-89 in White River Junction with no interchange and intersects I-91 again. Now on the east side of I-91, US 5 winds around the northwest edge of White River Junction, where it hooks up with US 4. US 4 and US 5 run concurrent for half a mile (0.80 km) as a divided four-lane surface arterial, crossing the White River. US 5 continues north to the village of Wilder, where it forms the main road of the village. North of Wilder, US 5 crosses I-91 twice. Just north of Norwich, US 5 crosses into Orange County and the town of Thetford. US 5 continues north, following the Connecticut River closely for 23 miles (37 km) until it reaches the town of Bradford, passing through the small villages of North Thetford and Ely.

=== Northern Vermont ===
For around 11 miles (18 km) north of Bradford, US 5 passes through rural country along the Connecticut River before reaching the village of Wells River. Here, US 5 has a very brief concurrency with US 302. Continuing north, US 5 crosses into Caledonia County, then travels 11 miles (18 km) before crossing to the west side of I-91, passing through East Ryegate and Barnet. US 5 crosses back and forth across the Interstate a couple of times north of Barnet before US 5 and I-91 split at the Passumpsic River, about two miles (3.2 km) north of Barnet. US 5 winds along the west bank of the Passumpsic River, traveling through the village of Passumpsic. US 5 and I-91 meet up again two miles (3.2 km) north of Passumpsic in the town of St. Johnsbury. It is here in St. Johnsbury that the Connecticut River turns east away from US 5.

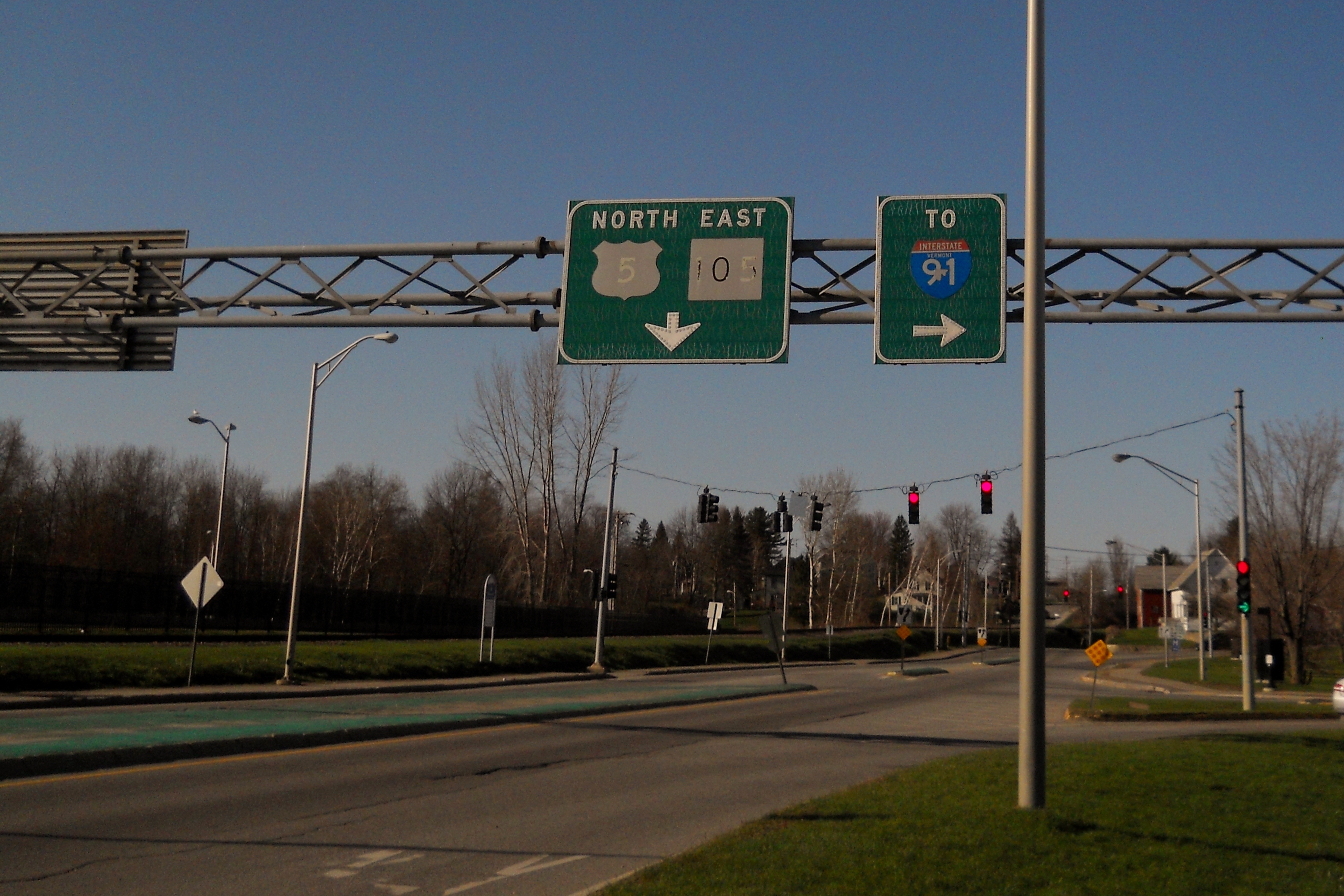
US 5 during its concurrency with VT 105 in Newport

US 5 continues north along the Passumpsic River from St. Johnsbury for about 7.5 miles (12.1 km) until it reaches the town of Lyndon. In Lyndon, US 5 splits to the east away from I-91. US 5 passes through West Burke, Willoughby State Forest, and Barton before reaching the town of Orleans, 25 miles (40 km) north of Lyndon. Along this stretch, US 5 reaches Orleans County. In the town of Orleans, US 5 crosses to the west side of the Interstate, concurrent with VT 58 for half a mile (0.80 km). US 5 continues north for 10 miles (16 km) before reaching Newport. Along this 10-mile (16 km) stretch, the road passes through Coventry. In Newport, US 5 picks up a five-mile-long (8.0 km) concurrency with VT 105 that takes US 5 across I-91 and into the village of Derby Center. US 5 continues north, crossing I-91 for the last time 2.5 miles (4.0 km) north of Derby Center. US 5 reaches its northern terminus at the international border, across the border from Stanstead, Quebec, 6.5 miles (10.5 km) north of Derby Center in the village of Derby Line. US 5 continues past the Derby Line–Stanstead Border Crossing into Quebec as Route 143.

== History ==

In 1922, before the United States Numbered Highway System's creation, US 5 traversed through Vermont as Route 2, the Connecticut River Way. Five years later in 1927, at the creation of the highway system, Route 2 was almost completely overtaken by the new US 5. At its original designation, US 5 mostly followed Route 2's path, except for a temporary routing into New Hampshire. From 1927 to 1929, US 5 crossed the Connecticut River at Bellows Falls into North Walpole, New Hampshire, and wound along the river to Charlestown, New Hampshire, where it crossed back into Vermont.

US 5 was not maintained by the state of Vermont until the creation of the state highway system in 1931. At this point, US 5 was not paved. The state of Vermont started paving the route in 1931, and it was completed by 1933.

== Major intersections ==
County	Location	mi	km	Destinations	Notes
Windham	Guilford	0.000	0.000	US 5 south – Bernardston, Springfield	Continuation into Massachusetts
Windham	Brattleboro	7.709– 8.038	12.406– 12.936	I-91 – Bernardston MA, Putney, White River Junction	Interchange, Exit 1 on I-91
Windham	Brattleboro	9.105	14.653	VT 142 south to VT 119 east	Northern terminus of VT 142
Windham	Brattleboro	9.282	14.938	VT 9 west to I-91	South end of VT 9 concurrency
Windham	Brattleboro	9.443	15.197	VT 30 north – Newfane, Townshend, Manchester	Southern terminus of VT 30
Windham	Brattleboro	11.591	18.654	VT 9 east / I-91 – Keene NH, Bellows Falls, Massachusetts	Roundabout; north end of VT 9 concurrency; Exit 3 on I-91
Windham	Dummerston	17.650	28.405	I-91 – Brattleboro	Interchange, Exit 4 on I-91
Windham	Putney	18.431	29.662	Westminster Road	
Windham	Westminster	28.431	45.755	VT 123 east – Walpole NH	Western terminus of VT 123; to NH 12
Windham	Westminster	29.237	47.052	Westminster Street	To I-91, Exit 5
Windham	Rockingham	31.839	51.240	VT 121 west – Saxtons River, Grafton	Eastern terminus of VT 121
Windham	Rockingham	32.671	52.579	Rockingham Street	To NH 12
Windham	Rockingham	35.470	57.083	VT 103 north / I-91 – Rockingham, Springfield, White River Junction, Brattleboro	Southern terminus of VT 103; exit 6 on I-91
Windsor	Springfield	42.675	68.679	VT 11 west – Springfield	West end of VT 11 concurrency
Windsor	Springfield	42.734– 43.101	68.774– 69.364	I-91 – Brattleboro, White River Junction	Interchange, Exit 7 on I-91
Windsor	Springfield	43.479	69.973	VT 11 east – Charlestown NH, Fort at No. 4	East end of VT 11 concurrency To NH 12
Windsor	Springfield	49.017	78.885	VT 143 west – Springfield	Eastern terminus of VT 143
Windsor	Weathersfield	54.673	87.988	VT 131 west to I-91 – Cavendish / VT 12 south – Claremont NH	Eastern terminus of VT 131; to I-91 Exit 8; South end of VT 12 concurrency
Windsor	Weathersfield	55.823	89.838	VT 44A north – Brownsville	Southern terminus of VT 44A
Windsor	Windsor	59.691	96.063	VT 44 west – Brownsville	Eastern terminus of VT 44
Windsor	Hartland	63.738	102.576	I-91 – White River Junction, Ascutney, Springfield	Interchange; exit 9 on I-91
Windsor	Hartland	64.777	104.248	VT 12 north – Woodstock	North end of VT 12 concurrency
Windsor	Hartford			I-89	No access between US 5 and I-89
Windsor	Hartford	73.654– 73.842	118.535– 118.837	I-91 to I-89 – Barre, Concord NH, Brattleboro, St. Johnsbury	Interchange; Exit 11 on I-91
Windsor	Hartford	74.382	119.706	US 4 west – Woodstock	West end of US 4 concurrency
Windsor	Hartford	74.943	120.609	US 4 east / VT 14 north	East end of US 4 concurrency; southern terminus of VT 14
Windsor	Norwich	79.413	127.803	I-91 south / VT 10A east to I-91 north – Thetford, St. Johnsbury, Wilder, White River Junction, Hanover NH	Western terminus of VT 10A; exit 13 on I-91; partial cloverleaf interchange
Windsor	Norwich			River Road ( VT 9540)	Northern terminus of unsigned VT 9540
Windsor	Norwich	85.130	137.003	VT 132 west – South Strafford	Eastern terminus of VT 132
Orange	Thetford	89.674	144.316	VT 113 east – Lyme NH	South end of VT 113 concurrency
Orange	Thetford	89.729	144.405	VT 113 west to I-91 – West Fairlee, Chelsea	North end of VT 113 concurrency
Orange	Fairlee	94.662	152.344	VT 244 west – Lake Fairlee, Post Mills	Eastern terminus of VT 244
Orange	Fairlee	97.599	157.070	VT 25A east – Orford NH	Western terminus of VT 25A
Orange	Bradford	103.065	165.867	VT 25 to I-91 – Wells River, Piermont NH	
Orange	Bradford	104.035	167.428	VT 25B west	Eastern terminus of VT 25B
Orange	Town of Newbury	116.874	188.090	US 302 east – Woodsville NH	South end of US 302 concurrency
Orange	Town of Newbury	117.003	188.298	US 302 west to I-91 – South Ryegate, Groton, Barre	North end of US 302 concurrency
Caledonia	Barnet	127.227	204.752	North Monroe Road	To NH 135
Caledonia	Barnet	127.407	205.042	To I-91 via Bimson Drive ( VT 9020) – West Barnet	Eastern terminus of unsigned VT 9020
Caledonia	St. Johnsbury	136.437– 136.657	219.574– 219.928	I-91 to I-93 / US 3 – Barnet, White River Junction, Lyndonville, Newport	Interchange, Exit 20 on I-91
Caledonia	St. Johnsbury	137.449	221.203	US 2 west	South end of US 2 concurrency
Caledonia	St. Johnsbury	137.563	221.386	US 2 east	North end of US 2 concurrency
Caledonia	Lyndon	144.865– 144.973	233.138– 233.311	I-91 – St. Johnsbury, Newport	Interchange, Exit 23 on I-91
Caledonia	Lyndon	147.193	236.884	VT 114 north – East Burke, Burke Mountain Ski Area, Island Pond / VT 122 north to I-91 – Wheelock, Sheffield, Airport	Southern terminus of VT 114; southern terminus of VT 122
Caledonia	Burke	154.491	248.629	VT 5A north – Westmore, Willoughby Lake	Southern terminus of VT 5A
Orleans	Barton	167.477	269.528	VT 16 east – Crystal Lake, Willoughby Lake	South end of VT 16 concurrency
Orleans	Barton	167.767	269.995	VT 16 south	North end of VT 16 concurrency
Orleans	Barton	172.548	277.689	VT 58 east – Orleans	East end of VT 58 concurrency
Orleans	Barton	172.588– 172.886	277.753– 278.233	I-91 – Newport, Barton, St. Johnsbury	Interchange, Exit 26 on I-91
Orleans	Irasburg	173.057	278.508	VT 58 west – Irasburg	West end of VT 58 concurrency
Orleans	Coventry	177.710	285.997	VT 14 south – Irasburg, Hardwick	South end of VT 14 concurrency
Orleans	Coventry	178.254	286.872	VT 14 north – Troy, Jay	North end of VT 14 concurrency
Orleans	Newport (city)	183.385	295.130	VT 105 west	West end of VT 105 concurrency
Orleans	Newport (city)	184.484	296.898	VT 191 to I-91	
Orleans	Derby	187.285– 187.502	301.406– 301.755	I-91 – St. Johnsbury, Canada	Interchange, Exit 28 on I-91
Orleans	Derby	188.389	303.183	VT 105 east to VT 111 – West Charleston	East end of VT 105 concurrency
Orleans	Derby	192.317	309.504	R-143 north	Continuation into Quebec, Canada
1.000 mi = 1.609 km; 1.000 km = 0.621 mi: Closed/former; Concurrency terminus

== See also ==
U.S. Route 5
Previous state: Massachusetts	Vermont	Next state: Terminus
