= Newark, Vermont =

- Town
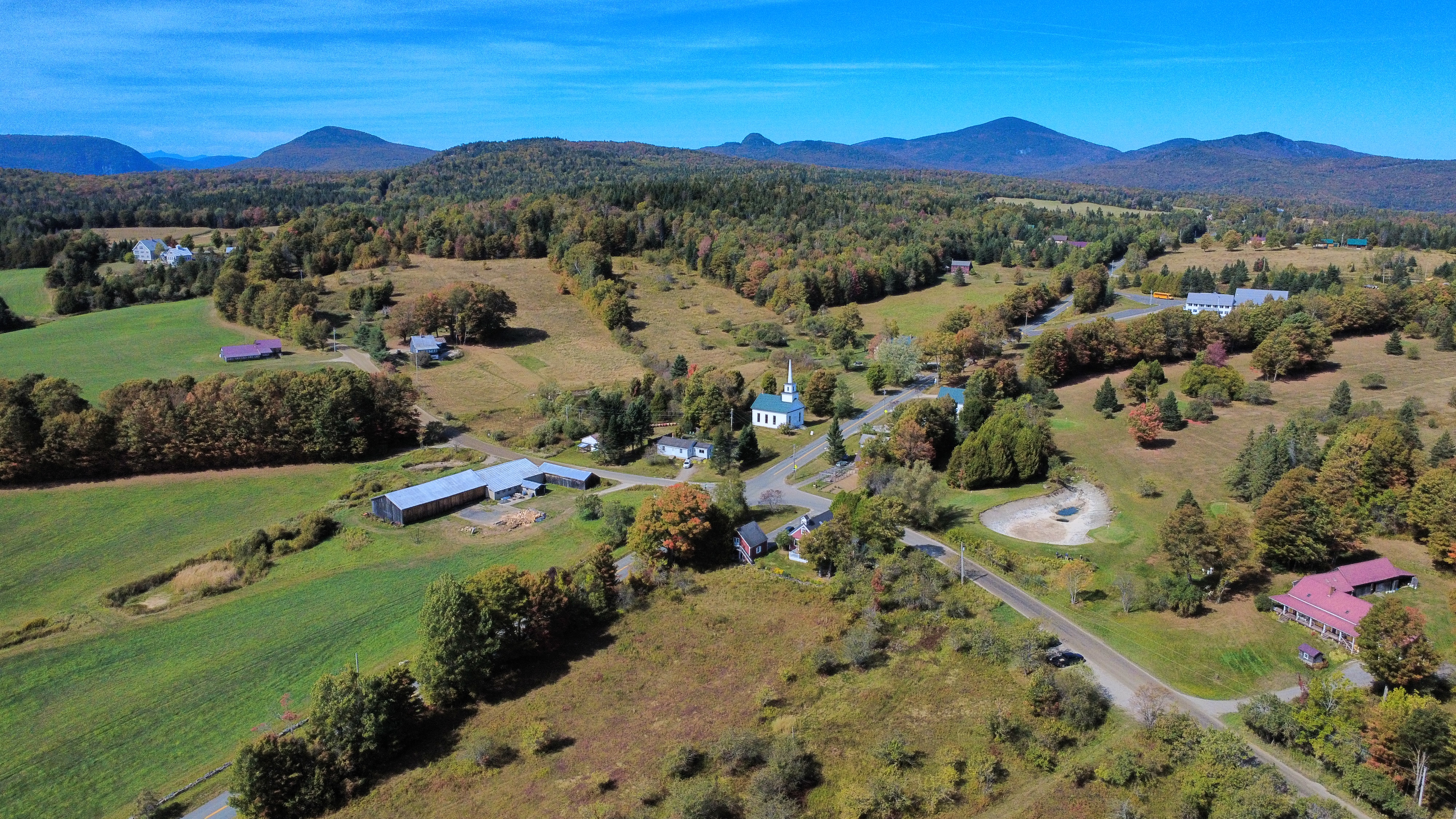
- View of Newark, VT, from the southeast

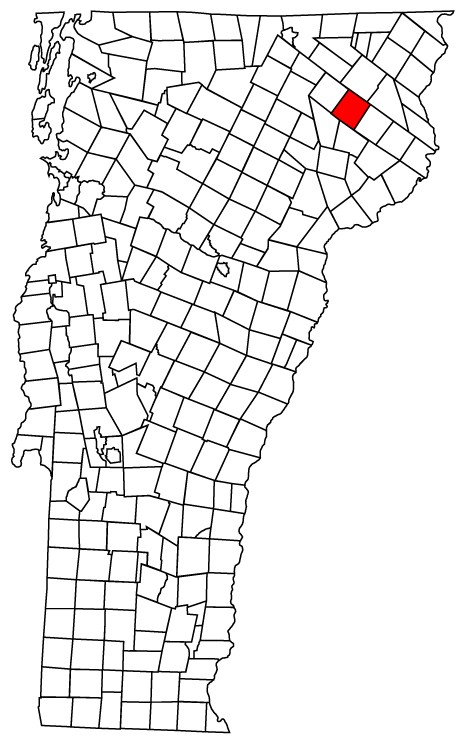
- Newark, Vermont
- Coordinates: 44°43′28″N 71°56′14″W
- Country: United States
- State: Vermont
- County: Caledonia
- Communities: Newark Street; Newark Hollow

Area
  - Total: 37.2 sq mi (96.4 km^{2})
  - Land: 36.8 sq mi (95.2 km^{2})
  - Water: 0.46 sq mi (1.2 km^{2})
- Elevation: 1,398 ft (426 m)

Population (2020)
  - Total: 584
  - Density: 16/sq mi (6.1/km^{2})
- Time zone: UTC-5 (Eastern (EST))
  - Summer (DST): UTC-4 (EDT)
- ZIP codes: 05871 (West Burke); 05837 (East Haven)
- Area code: 802
- FIPS code: 50-47725
- GNIS feature ID: 1462157

Newark is a town in Caledonia County, Vermont, United States. The population was 584 at the 2020 census.

== Geography ==
Newark is located at the northern tip of Caledonia County, Vermont. It is bordered by the town of Burke to the south, Sutton to the west, Westmore to the northwest, Brighton to the north, Ferdinand to the northeast, and East Haven to the southeast. According to the United States Census Bureau, the town has a total area of 37.2 square miles (96.4 km^{2}), of which 36.8 square miles (95.2 km^{2}) is land and 0.46 square miles (1.2 km^{2}), or 1.25%, is water.

Vermont Route 114 passes through the town, leading north to Island Pond in the town of Brighton and south to Lyndonville. Vermont Route 5A crosses the western corner of Newark, leading north past Lake Willoughby to Derby and south to U.S. Route 5 in West Burke.

The highest point in Newark is an unnamed 2,362-foot (720 m) summit near the northwest border with Westmore, west of Abbott Hill Road.

== Demographics ==
Historical population
Census	Pop.	Note	%±
1800	8		—
1810	88		1,000.0%
1820	154		75.0%
1830	257		66.9%
1840	360		40.1%
1850	434		20.6%
1860	567		30.6%
1870	593		4.6%
1880	679		14.5%
1890	536		−21.1%
1900	500		−6.7%
1910	415		−17.0%
1920	364		−12.3%
1930	301		−17.3%
1940	242		−19.6%
1950	192		−20.7%
1960	151		−21.4%
1970	144		−4.6%
1980	280		94.4%
1990	354		26.4%
2000	470		32.8%
2010	581		23.6%
2020	584		0.5%
U.S. Decennial Census

As of the census of 2000, there were 470 people, 19 households, and 12 families residing in the town. The population density was 12.8 people per square mile. There were 449 housing units at an average density of .2 per square mile (4.7/km^{2}). The racial makeup of the town was 98.94% White, 0.2% African American, 0.64% Native American and 0.21% Asian. Hispanic or Latino of any race were 0.43% of the population.

There were 191 households, out of which 29.3% had children under the age of 18 living with them, 50.8% were married couples living together, 11.0% had a female householder with no husband present, and 32.5% were non-families. 24.6% of all households were made up of individuals, and 9.4% had someone living alone who was 65 years of age or older. The average household size was 2.46 and the average family size was 2.94.

In the town, the population was spread out, with 27.0% under the age of 18, 4.5% from 18 to 24, 29.4% from 25 to 44, 27.7% from 45 to 64, and 11.5% who were 65 years of age or older. The median age was 39 years. For every 100 females, there were 94.2 males. For every 100 females age 18 and over, there were 105.4 males.

The median income for a household in the town was $33,611, and the median income for a family was $46,250. Males had a median income of $33,229 versus $22,045 for females. The per capita income for the town was $18,035. About 9.8% of families and 17.6% of the population were below the poverty line, including 19.8% of those under age 18 and 28.0% of those age 65 or over.

== Education ==
The K–8 school has about 70 students.

- Newark Street School located at 1448 Newark Street, Newark, VT 05871
