= Toll House (Burke, Vermont) =

- U.S. National Register of Historic Places
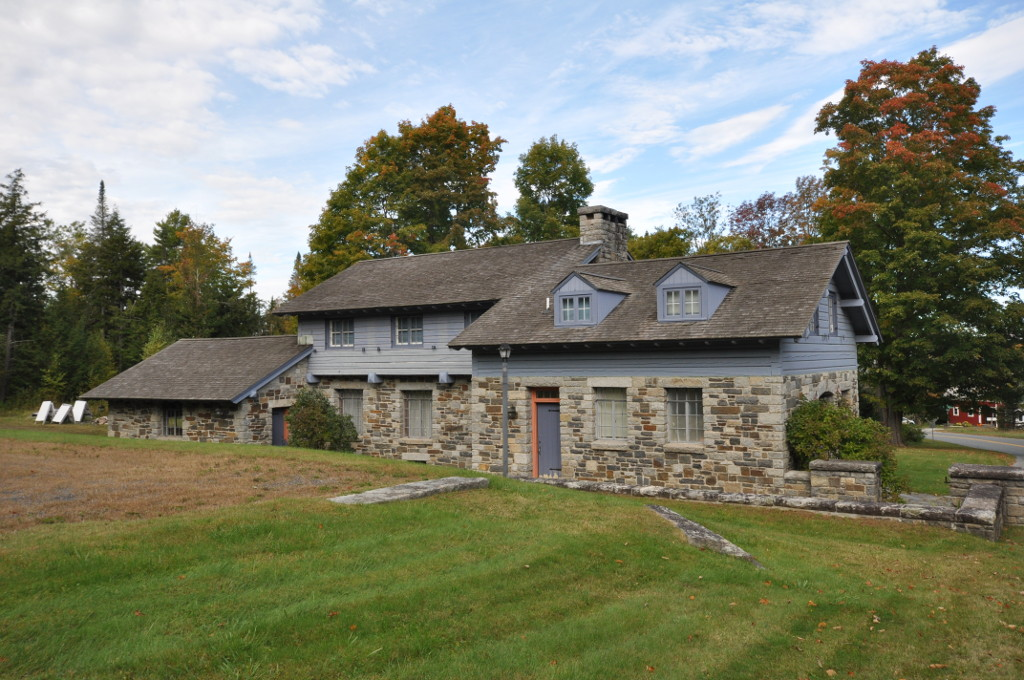

- Location within Vermont Location within the United States
- Location: 2028 Mountain Rd., Burke, Vermont
- Coordinates: 44°35′38″N 71°54′12″W
- Area: 2.2 acres (0.89 ha)
- Built: 1940
- Architect: Baker, W.F.; Civilian Conservation Corps
- Architectural style: Adirondack Rustic
- NRHP reference No.: 06000704
- Added to NRHP: August 09, 2006

The Toll House is a historic toll house at 2028 Mountain Road in Burke, Vermont. It was built in 1940-41 by crews of the Civilian Conservation Corps as an administrative headquarters for Darling State Park, and as a toll house for the Burke Mountain Road. It is one of the state's finest examples of CCC architecture. It was listed on the National Register of Historic Places in 2006.

== Description and history ==
The former Toll House is located in a rural setting on the north slope of Burke Mountain, on the west side of Mountain Road east of the Burke Mountain Academy. It is a two-story structure, with a rusticated stone first floor and squared log construction on the second. It is covered by a gabled roof. There are two flanking 1 1/2-story wings, set back from the main block, with similar styling. The wing nearest the street originally housed the toll facilities for the mountain road and caretaker's quarters, while the main block was designed for public access and offices of the park administration.

Land that made up Darling State Forest was purchased beginning in 1904 by Elmer Darling, owner of the Darling Estate, a large gentleman's farm and country estate on an adjacent ridge. After his death in 1931, his heirs gave the property on Burke Mountain to the state. Darling built a carriage road to the summit of Burke Mountain about 1910, which was improved in part by the CCC in the 1930s, when other park facilities, including construction of this house, took place. The house remained state property until 1969, when it was sold to the operators of the Burke Mountain Ski Area. They used the building for administrative and residential purposes until 2000, when it was sold into private ownership following the ski area's bankruptcy.

== See also ==
- National Register of Historic Places listings in Caledonia County, Vermont
