= Vermont Route 16 =

State highway in northern Vermont, US

Vermont Route 16
- Map of northeastern Vermont with VT 16 highlighted in red

Route information
- Maintained by VTrans and the Towns of Barton and Westmore
- Length: 27.890 mi (44.885 km)
- Existed: May 1, 1960–present

Major junctions
- South end: VT 15 in Hardwick
- I-91 in Barton; US 5 in Barton
- East end: VT 5A in Westmore

Location
- Country: United States
- State: Vermont
- Counties: Caledonia, Orleans

Highway system
- State highways in Vermont
← VT 15	→ VT 17
← VT 53		→ VT 58
← Route 11	N.E.	→ Route 12A

Vermont Route 16 (VT 16) is a 27.890-mile-long (44.885 km) state highway in northern Vermont, United States. It begins at VT 15 in Hardwick and heads northward to U.S. Route 5 (US 5) in Barton. From Barton, it heads eastward to VT 5A in Westmore. The portion of VT 16 east of US 5 is town-maintained and signed east–west. The remainder of the route is signed north–south.

West of Barton, the road used to be part of New England Interstate Route 12. The segment of VT 16 from Barton to Westmore was once Vermont Route 56.

== Route description ==
Vermont Route 16 begins at an intersection with Vermont Route 15 in the town of Hardwick, about two miles (3 km) east of the town center. It proceeds north about 1.7 miles (2.7 km) to the village of East Hardwick, roughly paralleling the path of the Lamoille River upstream. It continues for several miles through the Lamoille River valley into the village of Greensboro Bend within the town of Greensboro. As VT 16 continues north, it soon passes by Horse Pond, the source of the Lamoille River, clipping the town of Wheelock briefly before returning to Greensboro. After about a mile, VT 16 enters the town of Glover, passing through a mountain pass within the Black Hills, soon reaching Clarks Pond, the source of the Barton River. VT 16, now known as Dry Pond Road then follows the Barton River downstream as it continues its northward journey. Several miles later, still following the Barton river, VT 16 meets its first major intersection, Vermont Route 122, about a mile and a half south of Glover center. The road name changes to Glover Street at this point and continues towards Glover center.

After passing through Glover center, VT 16 enters the town of Barton, then has a junction with I-91 (at Exit 25) about 1.2 miles (1.9 km) later. VT 16 enters the village of Barton, becoming Church Street until an intersection with U.S. Route 5 in the village square. VT 16 then turns south along US 5 along a short wrong-way concurrency to Eastern Avenue, where VT 16 continues eastward. After leaving the village, the road name becomes Willoughby Lake Road and runs for another six miles (10 km) skirting around Barton Mountain as it heads into the town of Westmore. It ends just after entering Westmore at an intersection with Vermont Route 5A, about one mile north of the Westmore center at the north shore of Lake Willoughby.

== History ==
The portion of VT 16 west of US 5 was originally numbered in 1922 as part of Route 12 of the New England road marking system. Route 12 was a multi-state route known as the "Keene Way" that began in New London, Connecticut, passing through Worcester, Massachusetts and Keene, New Hampshire before entering Vermont. In Vermont, it passed through Montpelier and continued north through the village of Barton, ending at the city of Newport. When the Vermont state highway system was officially created in 1931, New England Route 12 became Vermont Route 12, running 157 miles (253 km) from Ascutney to the city of Newport. In 1955, a new route from Montpelier to Morrisville was added to the state highway system as the "Montpelier-Morrisville State Highway". At around the same time, the road from Barton village to Westmore center had been designated as VT 56.

On May 1, 1960, several changes took place to the state route designations in the area. North of Montpelier, VT 12 was relocated to use the Montpelier-Morrisville State Highway. The original VT 12 alignment north of Montpelier was split into two routes. The Montpelier-Hardwick segment was assigned as an extension of Vermont Route 14, while the Hardwick-Barton segment was re-designated as Vermont Route 16. The Barton-Newport segment, which overlapped with U.S. Route 5, became just U.S. Route 5. VT 16 was later extended along old VT 56 to its current northern terminus at VT 5A.

== Major intersections ==
County	Location	mi	km	Destinations	Notes
Caledonia	Hardwick	0.000	0.000	VT 15 – South Walden, West Danville, Hardwick, Morrisville	Southern terminus
Orleans	Glover	15.986	25.727	VT 122 south – Sheffield, Wheelock	Northern terminus of VT 122
Orleans	Barton	19.373– 19.486	31.178– 31.360	I-91 – Lyndonville, St. Johnsbury, Orleans	Exit 25 on I-91
Orleans	Barton	20.540	33.056	US 5 north – Orleans, Newport	Northern end of wrong-way concurrency with US 5
Orleans	Barton	20.830	33.523	US 5 south – West Burke, Lyndonville	Western end of wrong-way concurrency with US 5
Orleans	Westmore	27.890	44.885	VT 5A – West Charleston, Westmore, West Burke	Eastern terminus
1.000 mi = 1.609 km; 1.000 km = 0.621 mi: Concurrency terminus
