= Kirby, Vermont =

- Town
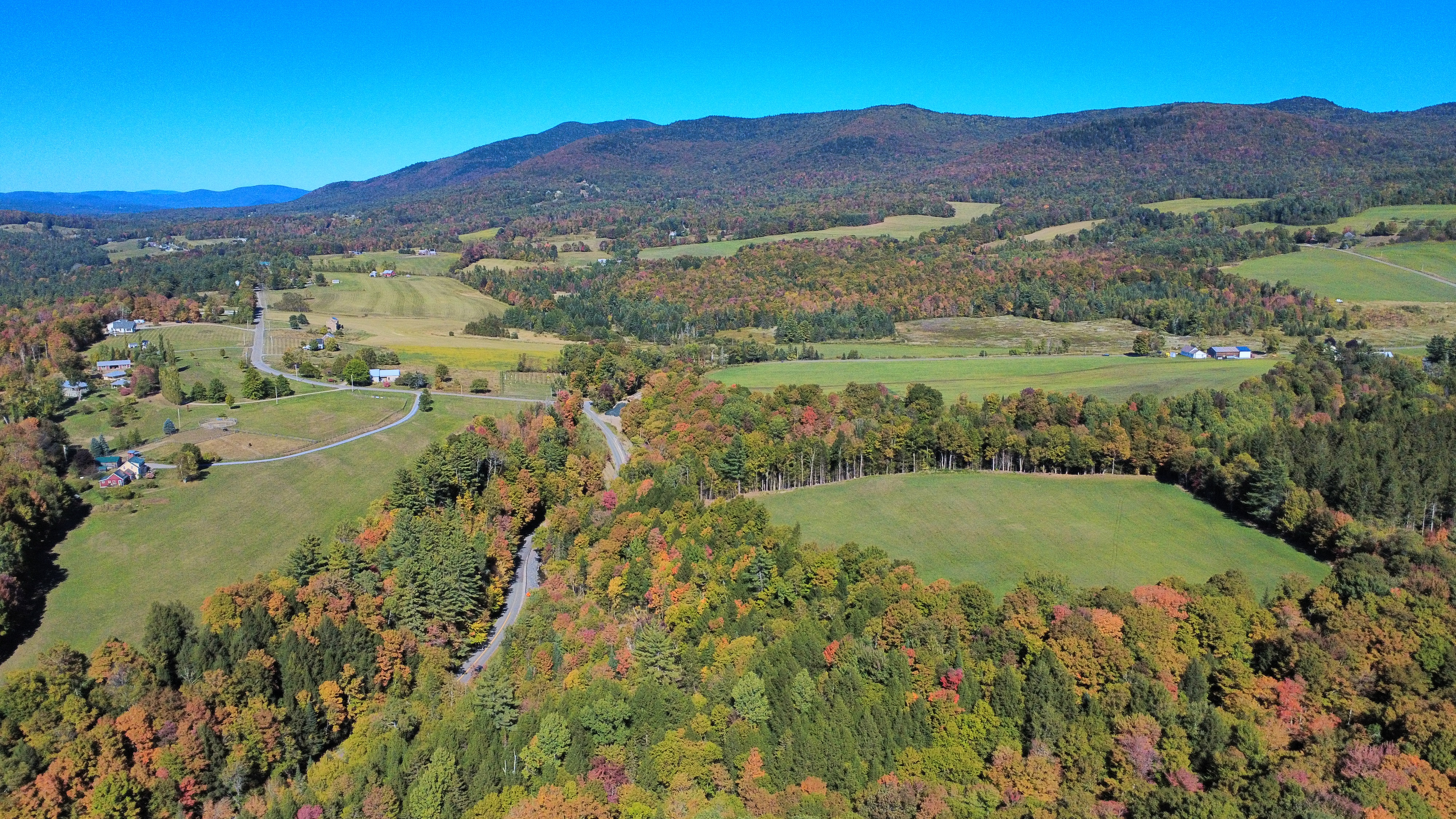
- View of North Kirby, VT, from the southwest

- Seal

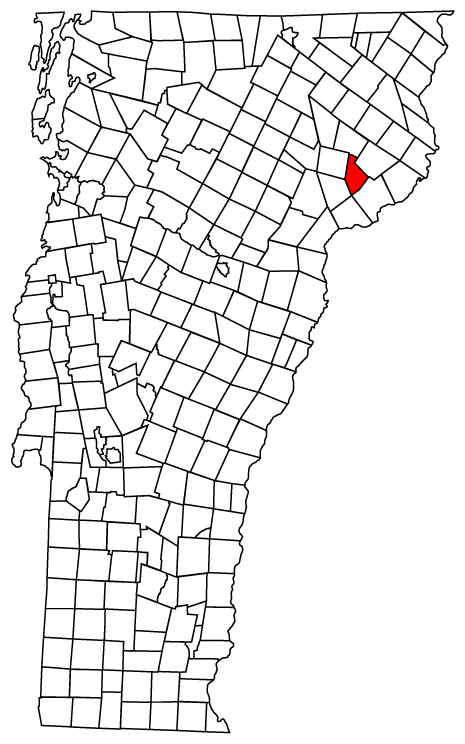
- Kirby, Vermont
- Coordinates: 44°29′30″N 71°53′40″W
- Country: United States
- State: Vermont
- County: Caledonia

Area
  - Total: 24.4 sq mi (63.2 km^{2})
  - Land: 24.4 sq mi (63.1 km^{2})
  - Water: 0.039 sq mi (0.1 km^{2})
- Elevation: 1,568 ft (478 m)

Population (2020)
  - Total: 575
  - Density: 24/sq mi (9.1/km^{2})
- Time zone: UTC-5 (Eastern (EST))
  - Summer (DST): UTC-4 (EDT)
- ZIP codes: 05824 (Concord); 05851 (Lyndonville); 05832 (East Burke)
- Area code: 802
- FIPS code: 50-37900
- GNIS feature ID: 1462130
- Website: https://www.kirbyvt.gov/

Kirby is a town in Caledonia County, Vermont, United States. The population was 575 at the 2020 census.

== History ==
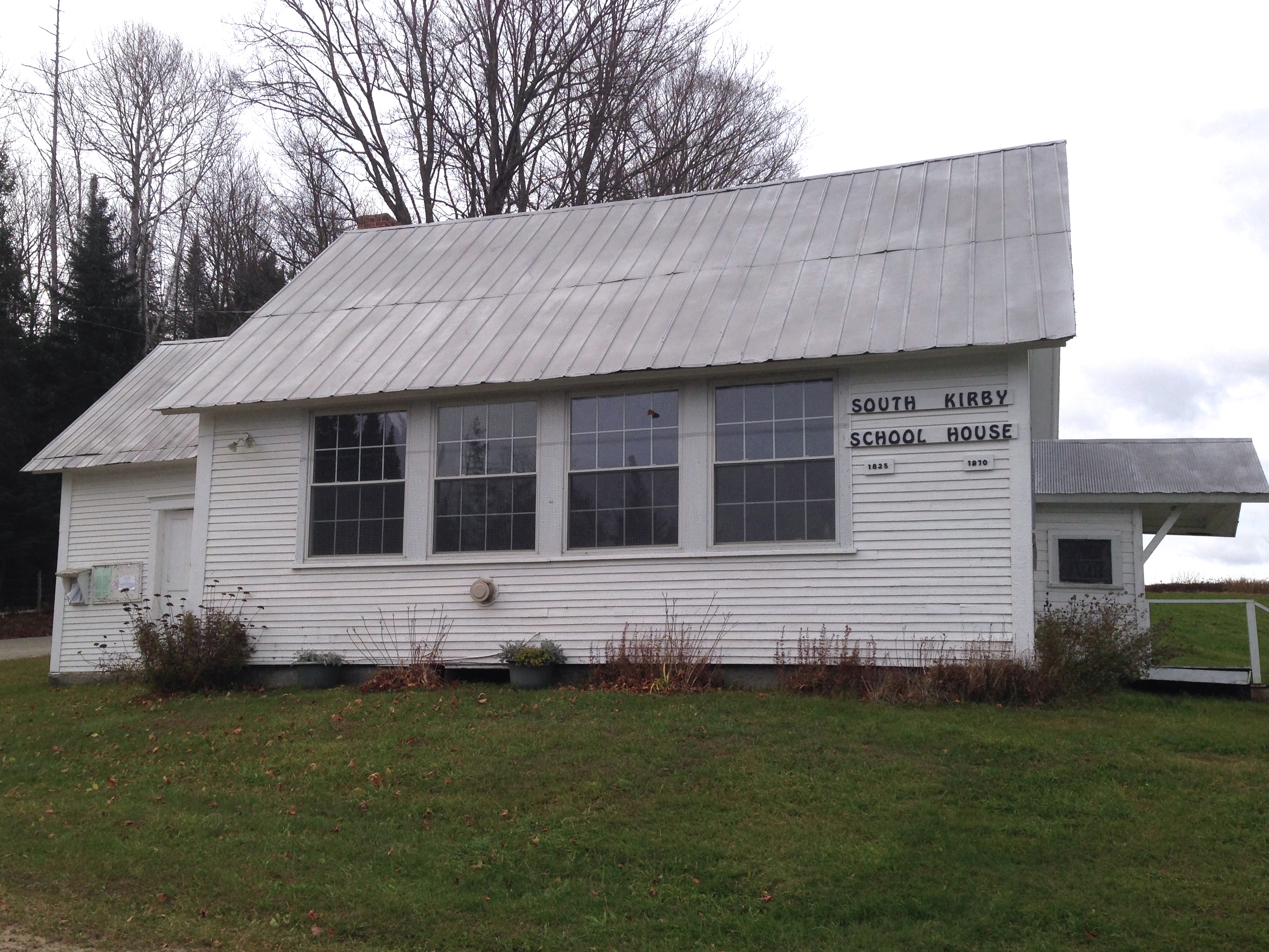
South Kirby School House

The town was chartered to Roswell Hopkins in 1790; Hopkins served as Clerk of the House of Representatives and Secretary of State of Vermont, and he accepted the land grant in lieu of cash as payment for his government service. The grant Hopkins received was originally called Hopkinsville; it was later combined with a parcel from the town of Burke, and renamed Kirby. Several ideas have been proposed for how the name Kirby was chosen; the most common is that it is a variant of the English Kirkby, which means a village or settlement around a church. By the time the town was organized in 1807, Hopkins had sold his interest and moved to Hopkinton, New York.

== Geography ==
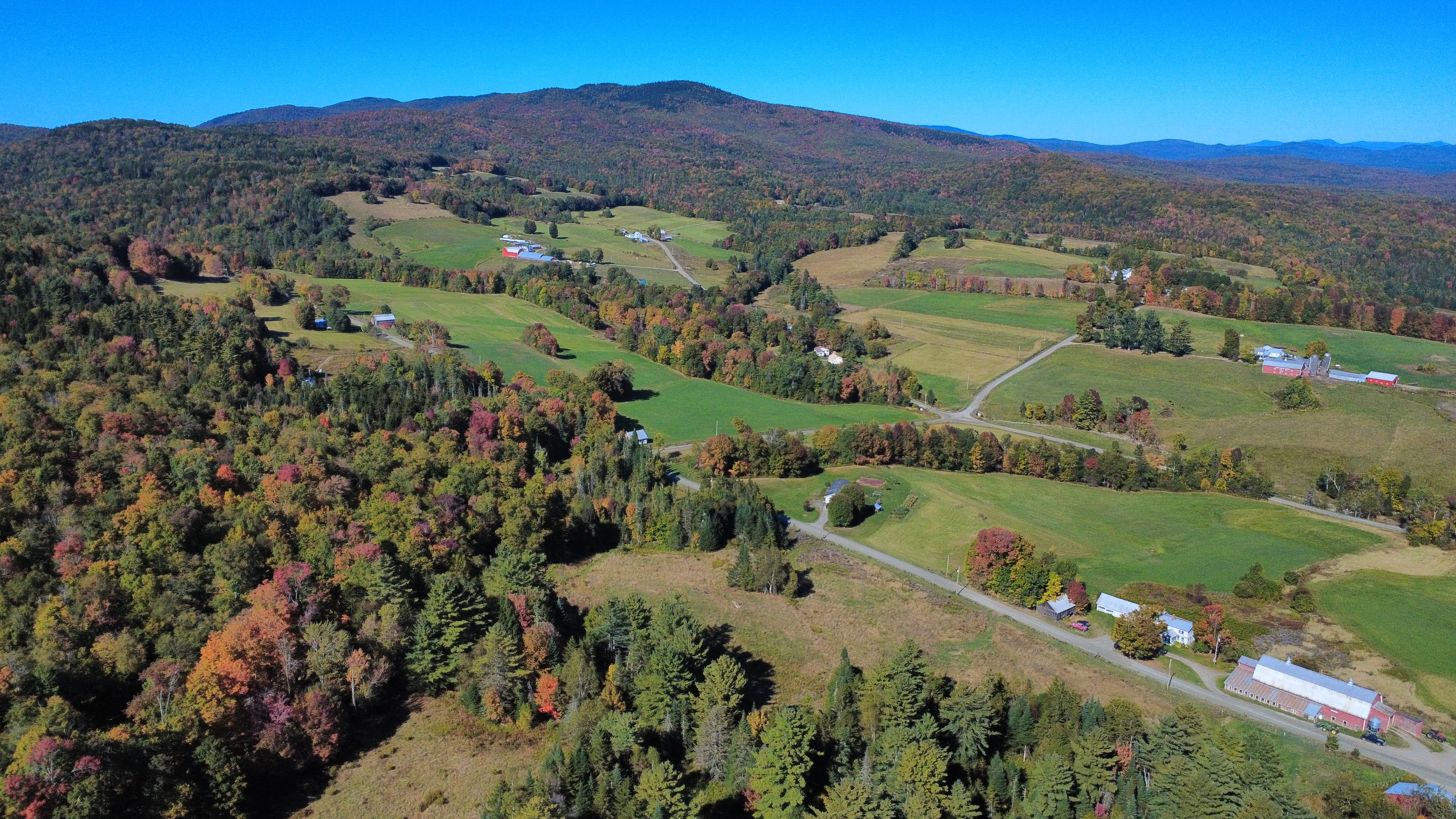
View of South Kirby, VT, from the southwest

Kirby is located on the eastern border of Caledonia County in northeastern Vermont. It is bordered by the town of St. Johnsbury to the southwest, Lyndon to the west, Burke to the north, Victory to the northeast, Concord to the southeast, and Waterford to the south. According to the United States Census Bureau, the town has a total area of 24.4 square miles (63.2 km^{2}), of which 24.4 square miles (63.1 km^{2}) is land and 0.04 square miles (0.1 km^{2}), or 0.20%, is water.

U.S. Route 2 passes through the southern corner of the town, connecting St. Johnsbury to the west with Lancaster, New Hampshire, to the east.

The highest point in Kirby is the 2,750-foot (840 m) summit of Kirby Mountain, located along the town boundary with Victory.

== Demographics ==
Historical population
Census	Pop.	Note	%±
1800	20		—
1810	311		1,455.0%
1820	312		0.3%
1830	401		28.5%
1840	520		29.7%
1850	509		−2.1%
1860	473		−7.1%
1870	417		−11.8%
1880	398		−4.6%
1890	355		−10.8%
1900	350		−1.4%
1910	297		−15.1%
1920	324		9.1%
1930	311		−4.0%
1940	252		−19.0%
1950	257		2.0%
1960	235		−8.6%
1970	224		−4.7%
1980	282		25.9%
1990	347		23.0%
2000	456		31.4%
2010	493		8.1%
2020	575		16.6%
U.S. Decennial Census

As of the census of 2000, there were 456 people, 168 households, and 122 families residing in the town. The population density was 18.7 people per square mile (7.2/km^{2}). There were 207 housing units at an average density of 8.5 per square mile (3.3/km^{2}). The racial makeup of the town was 96.05% White, 0.44% African American, 0.44% from other races, and 3.07% from two or more races. Hispanic or Latino of any race were 1.54% of the population.

There were 168 households, out of which 36.9% had children under the age of 18 living with them, 56.0% were married couples living together, 9.5% had a female householder with no husband present, and 26.8% were non-families. 19.0% of all households were made up of individuals, and 4.8% had someone living alone who was 65 years of age or older. The average household size was 2.71 and the average family size was 3.05.

In the town, the population was spread out, with 28.9% under the age of 18, 5.5% from 18 to 24, 28.3% from 25 to 44, 28.5% from 45 to 64, and 8.8% who were 65 years of age or older. The median age was 37 years. For every 100 females, there were 99.1 males. For every 100 females age 18 and over, there were 98.8 males.

The median income for a household in the town was $37,917, and the median income for a family was $43,333. Males had a median income of $27,778 versus $22,500 for females. The per capita income for the town was $16,675. About 15.2% of families and 15.3% of the population were below the poverty line, including 22.0% of those under age 18 and 12.8% of those age 65 or over.

== Notable people ==
- William W. Grout, US Congressman
- John McClaughry, member of the Vermont House of Representatives and Vermont Senate
- Moriah Wilson, cyclist and murder victim
