= Burke, Vermont =

- Town
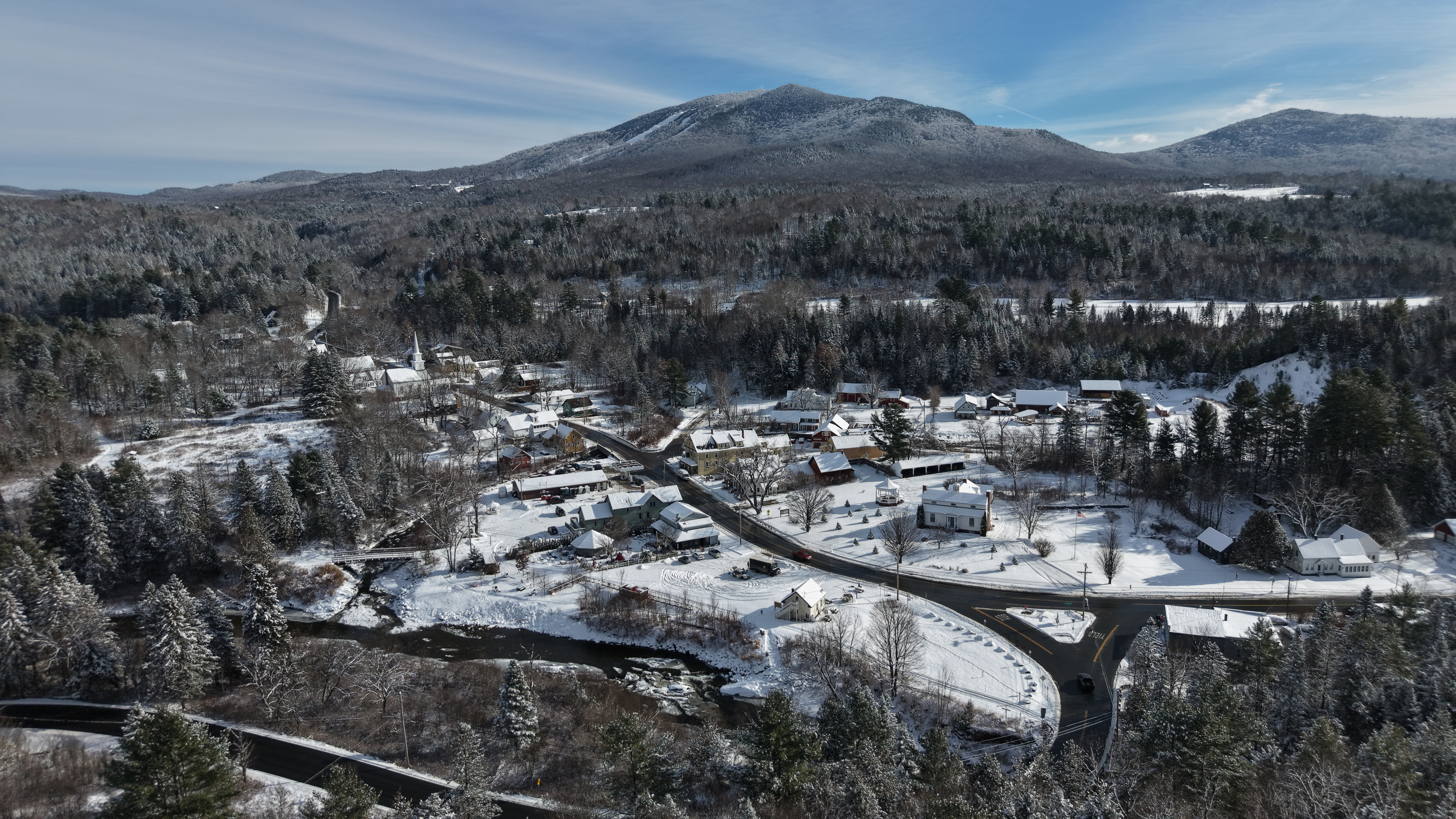
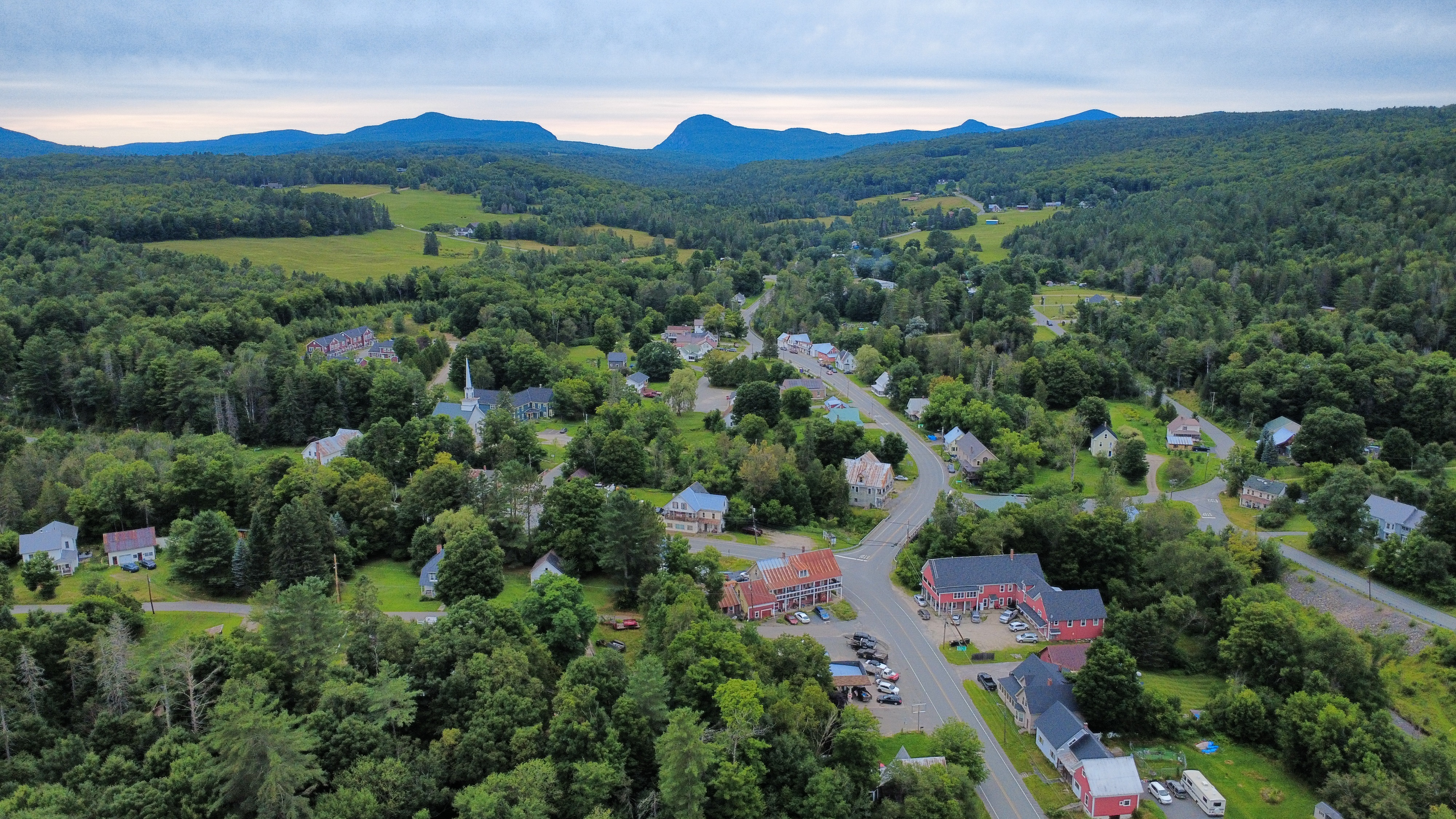
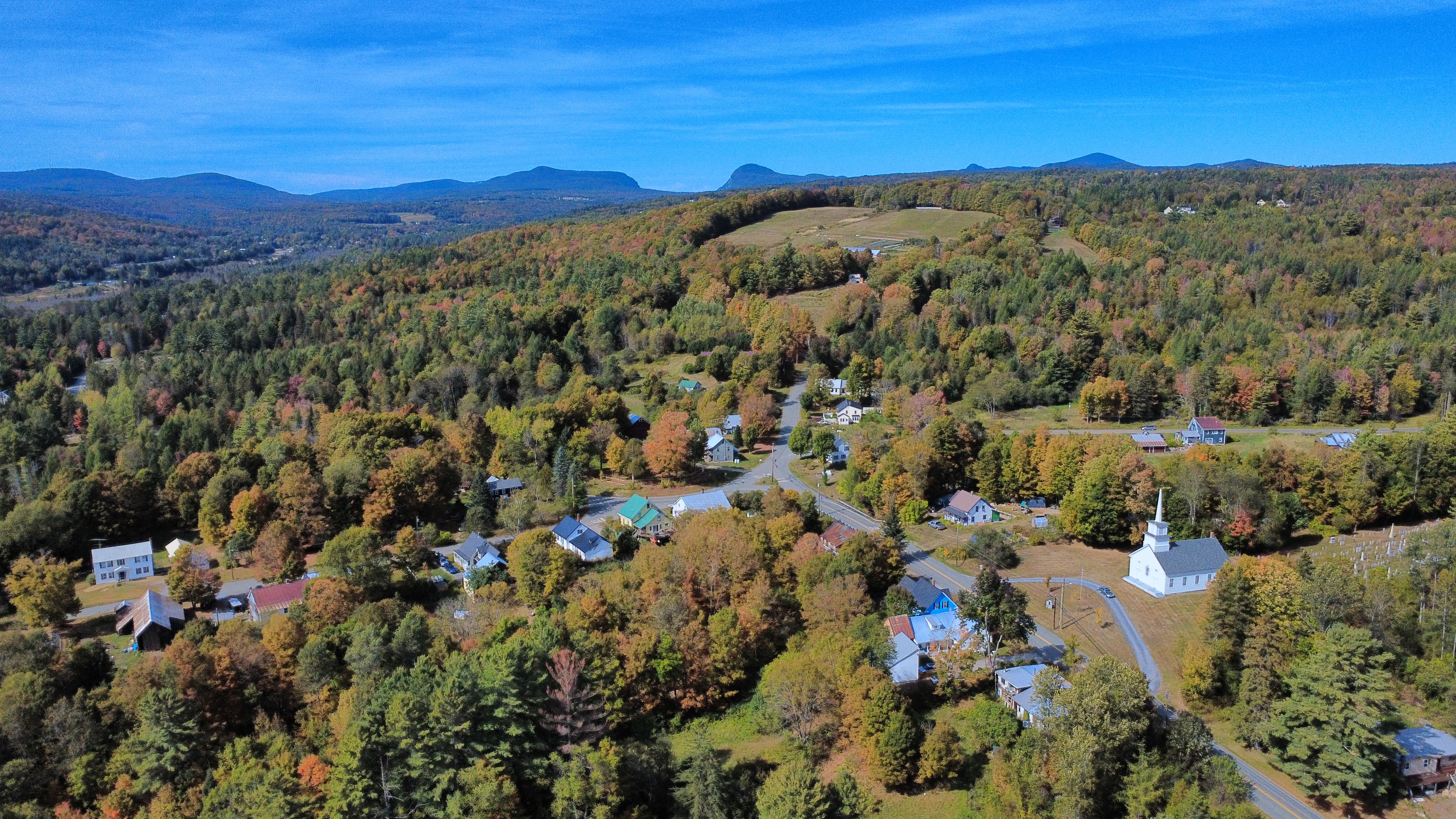
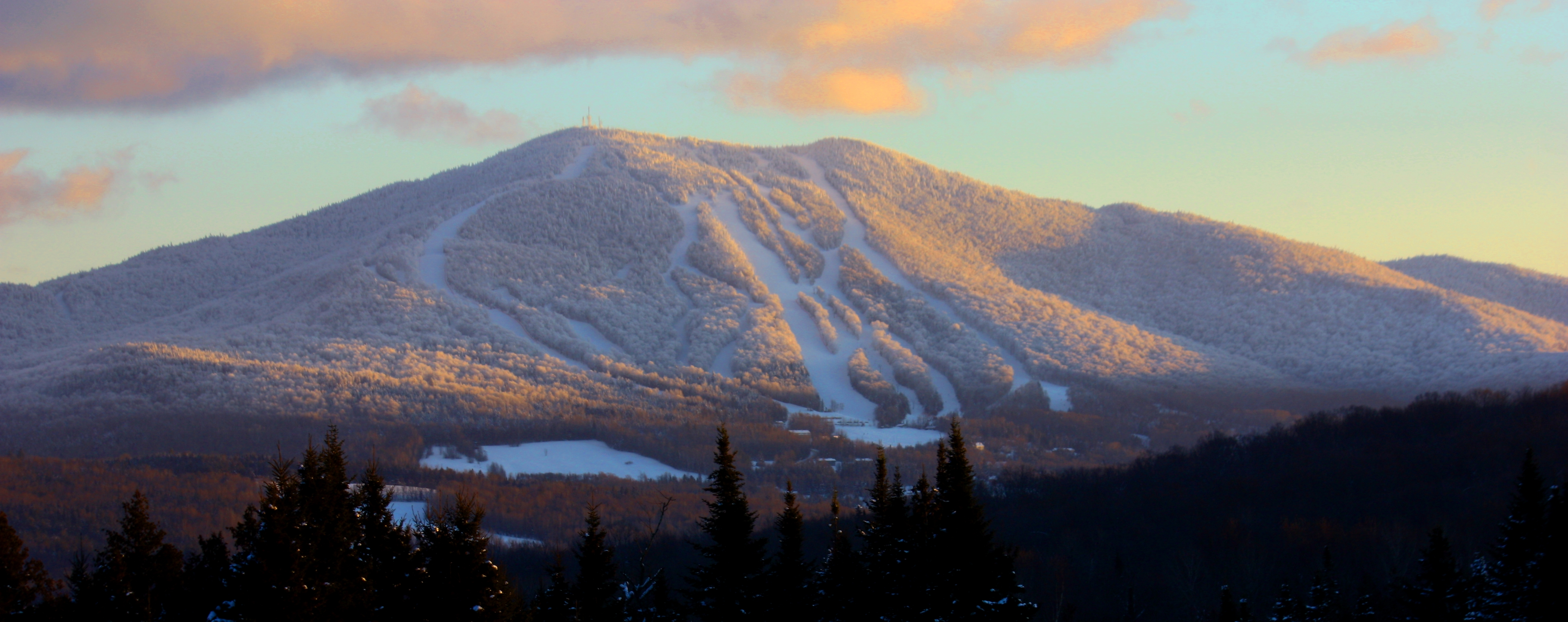
- East Burke West Burke Burke Hollow Burke Mountain

- Logo

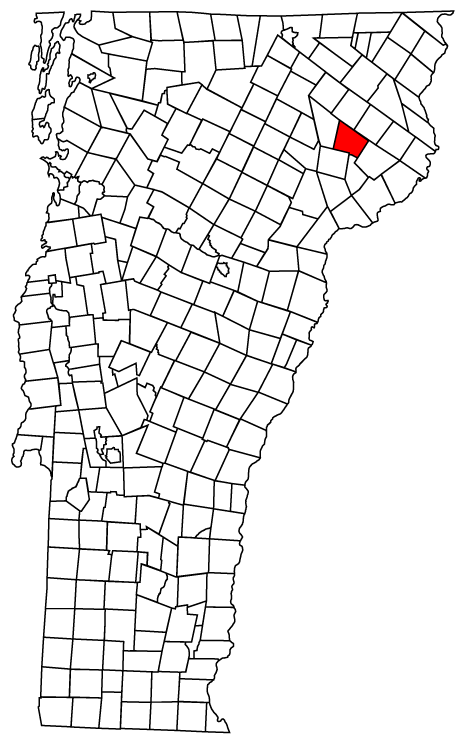
- Burke, Vermont
- Coordinates: 44°37′44″N 71°54′30″W
- Country: United States
- State: Vermont
- County: Caledonia
- Chartered: 1782
- Settled: 1790
- Organized: 1796
- Communities: East Burke; West Burke; Burke Hollow

Area
  - Total: 34.0 sq mi (88.1 km^{2})
  - Land: 33.9 sq mi (87.8 km^{2})
  - Water: 0.15 sq mi (0.4 km^{2})
- Elevation: 994 ft (303 m)

Population (2020)
  - Total: 1,651
  - Density: 49/sq mi (18.8/km^{2})
- Time zone: UTC-5 (Eastern (EST))
  - Summer (DST): UTC-4 (EDT)
- ZIP codes: 05832 (East Burke); 05871 (West Burke); 05851 (Lyndonville)
- Area code: 802
- FIPS code: 50-10450
- GNIS feature ID: 1462059
- Website: www.burkevermont.org

Burke is a town in Caledonia County, Vermont, United States. The population was 1,651 at the 2020 census. The town contains the villages of East Burke, West Burke and Burke Hollow. The town is home to Burke Mountain and Burke Mountain Academy.

== Etymology ==
The town was named for Sir Edmund Burke, a member of the English Parliament.

== Geography ==
According to the United States Census Bureau, the town has a total area of 34.0 square miles (88.1 km^{2}), of which 33.9 square miles (87.8 km^{2}) is land and 0.15 square miles (0.4 km^{2}), or 0.40%, is water.

Burke is bordered by the towns of Lyndon and Kirby to the south, Victory to the southeast, East Haven to the northeast, Newark to the north, and Sutton to the west. U.S. Route 5 runs through the western part of the town, connecting Lyndonville to the south with Barton and Newport to the north. Vermont Route 5A leaves US-5 in the village of West Burke, leading north past Lake Willoughby to Derby. Vermont Route 114 runs through East Burke, leading north to Island Pond and south to US-5 in Lyndonville.

The highest point in town is Burke Mountain, at 3,271 feet (997 m).

== Climate ==
According to the Köppen Climate Classification system, Burke has a warm-summer humid continental climate, abbreviated "Dfb" on climate maps. The hottest temperature recorded in Burke was 98 °F (36.7 °C) on July 19, 1953, while the coldest temperature recorded was −41 °F (−40.6 °C) on February 2–3, 1962.

Climate data for Burke, Vermont, 1981–2010 normals, extremes 1948–2017
Month	Jan	Feb	Mar	Apr	May	Jun	Jul	Aug	Sep	Oct	Nov	Dec	Year
Record high °F (°C)	61 (16)	61 (16)	77 (25)	90 (32)	92 (33)	95 (35)	98 (37)	96 (36)	96 (36)	83 (28)	70 (21)	60 (16)	98 (37)
Mean maximum °F (°C)	43.3 (6.3)	46.2 (7.9)	59.3 (15.2)	76.0 (24.4)	83.0 (28.3)	89.0 (31.7)	89.9 (32.2)	88.4 (31.3)	83.0 (28.3)	71.9 (22.2)	62.6 (17.0)	45.5 (7.5)	91.7 (33.2)
Mean daily maximum °F (°C)	23.8 (−4.6)	28.4 (−2.0)	38.1 (3.4)	52.7 (11.5)	65.9 (18.8)	75.2 (24.0)	79.5 (26.4)	78.1 (25.6)	68.9 (20.5)	55.0 (12.8)	41.4 (5.2)	29.4 (−1.4)	53.0 (11.7)
Daily mean °F (°C)	11.8 (−11.2)	14.5 (−9.7)	24.9 (−3.9)	39.7 (4.3)	51.3 (10.7)	61.2 (16.2)	65.9 (18.8)	64.3 (17.9)	55.7 (13.2)	43.4 (6.3)	32.1 (0.1)	19.5 (−6.9)	40.4 (4.6)
Mean daily minimum °F (°C)	−0.2 (−17.9)	0.6 (−17.4)	11.6 (−11.3)	26.7 (−2.9)	36.7 (2.6)	47.2 (8.4)	52.2 (11.2)	50.4 (10.2)	42.6 (5.9)	31.8 (−0.1)	22.7 (−5.2)	9.6 (−12.4)	27.7 (−2.4)
Mean minimum °F (°C)	−26.0 (−32.2)	−24.0 (−31.1)	−15.8 (−26.6)	11.0 (−11.7)	22.9 (−5.1)	30.4 (−0.9)	38.8 (3.8)	34.4 (1.3)	27.1 (−2.7)	17.8 (−7.9)	3.4 (−15.9)	−15.8 (−26.6)	−28.9 (−33.8)
Record low °F (°C)	−40 (−40)	−41 (−41)	−34 (−37)	−11 (−24)	15 (−9)	19 (−7)	29 (−2)	26 (−3)	19 (−7)	9 (−13)	−12 (−24)	−35 (−37)	−41 (−41)
Average precipitation inches (mm)	2.89 (73)	2.30 (58)	2.75 (70)	2.89 (73)	3.83 (97)	4.11 (104)	4.61 (117)	4.83 (123)	3.54 (90)	4.20 (107)	3.62 (92)	3.32 (84)	42.89 (1,088)
Average snowfall inches (cm)	23.3 (59)	19.0 (48)	15.5 (39)	5.9 (15)	0.0 (0.0)	0.0 (0.0)	0.0 (0.0)	0.0 (0.0)	0.0 (0.0)	0.3 (0.76)	7.5 (19)	20.6 (52)	92.1 (232.76)
Average extreme snow depth inches (cm)	19.8 (50)	25.2 (64)	24.8 (63)	10.3 (26)	0.1 (0.25)	0.0 (0.0)	0.0 (0.0)	0.0 (0.0)	0.0 (0.0)	0.5 (1.3)	3.9 (9.9)	13.3 (34)	28.2 (72)
Average precipitation days (≥ 0.01 in)	16.1	13.2	13.3	13.2	14.8	14.1	13.4	14.1	13.7	14.9	16.4	16.4	173.6
Average snowy days (≥ 0.1 in)	12.1	8.4	6.9	2.7	0.0	0.0	0.0	0.0	0.0	0.4	4.9	10.8	46.2
Source 1: NOAA
Source 2: XMACIS2

== Demographics ==
Historical population
Census	Pop.	Note	%±
1800	108		—
1810	460		325.9%
1820	541		17.6%
1830	866		60.1%
1840	997		15.1%
1850	1,103		10.6%
1860	1,138		3.2%
1870	1,162		2.1%
1880	1,252		7.7%
1890	1,198		−4.3%
1900	1,184		−1.2%
1910	1,183		−0.1%
1920	1,041		−12.0%
1930	1,016		−2.4%
1940	998		−1.8%
1950	1,042		4.4%
1960	922		−11.5%
1970	1,053		14.2%
1980	1,385		31.5%
1990	1,406		1.5%
2000	1,571		11.7%
2010	1,753		11.6%
2020	1,651		−5.8%
U.S. Decennial Census

As of the census of 2000, there were 1,571 people, 641 households, and 455 families residing in the town. The population density was 46.1 people per square mile (17.8/km^{2}). There were 892 housing units at an average density of 26.2 per square mile (10.1/km^{2}). The racial makeup of the town was 97.14% White, 0.25% African American, 0.57% Native American, 0.19% Asian, 0.38% from other races, and 1.46% from two or more races. Hispanic or Latino of any race were 1.08% of the population.

There were 641 households, out of which 30.4% had children under the age of 18 living with them, 58.0% were married couples living together, 9.8% had a female householder with no husband present, and 29.0% were non-families. 21.7% of all households were made up of individuals, and 5.8% had someone living alone who was 65 years of age or older. The average household size was 2.45 and the average family size was 2.83.

In the town, the population was spread out, with 23.6% under the age of 18, 8.0% from 18 to 24, 28.8% from 25 to 44, 28.3% from 45 to 64, and 11.4% who were 65 years of age or older. The median age was 39 years. For every 100 females, there were 108.6 males. For every 100 females age 18 and over, there were 102.7 males.

== Economy ==
=== Personal income ===
The median income for a household in the town was $35,268, and the median income for a family was $41,563. Males had a median income of $28,977 versus $19,509 for females. The per capita income for the town was $20,697. About 11.7% of families and 13.9% of the population were below the poverty line, including 18.0% of those under age 18 and 13.8% of those age 65 or over. Burke has the highest per capita income of any place in Caledonia County or the Northeast Kingdom.

=== Tourism ===
Burke Mountain is home to Burke Mountain Resort, a mid-size ski area open to skiing and snowboarding in winter and downhill mountain biking in summer. The Resort includes a hotel with a pool, two restaurants, and an arcade. It is a popular location for weddings and other events. The mountain is also home to Burke Mountain Academy, a premier ski academy.

East Burke is home to the Kingdom Trails trail system. Mountain bikers frequent the trails in the summer and autumn, during which there are hundreds of riders at any given time riding the local trails.

The town is also located just south of Lakes Willoughby and Crystal and the Mountains Hor and Pisgah around them, which attract swimmers and hikers.

== Notable people ==
- Henrietta A. Bingham (1841–1877), writer, editor, preceptress
- John Q. Farmer (1823-1904), Minnesota state legislator
- Buddy Jones (1937–2014), Bluegrass musician and music recorder/distributor
- Charles Albert Woodruff (1845–1920), US Army brigadier general; born in Burke in 1845
