= North Thetford, Vermont =

- Village
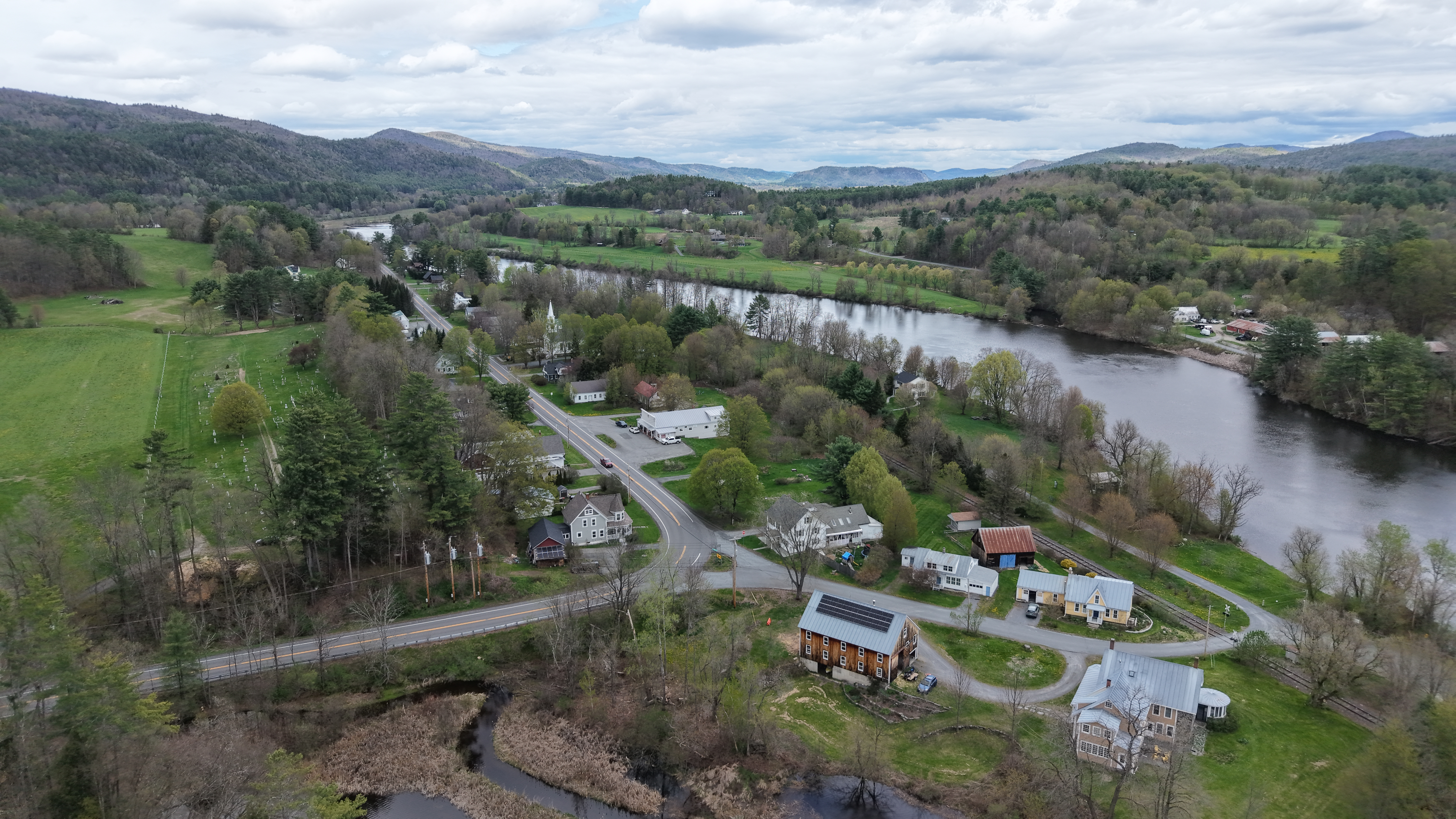
- North Thetford, Vermont, from the south

- Location within Vermont Location within the United States
- Coordinates: 43°50′35″N 72°11′08″W
- Country: United States
- State: Vermont
- County: Orange
- Elevation: 420 ft (130 m)
- Time zone: UTC-5 (Eastern (EST))
  - Summer (DST): UTC-4 (EDT)
- ZIP code: 05054
- Area code: 802
- GNIS feature ID: 1458764

North Thetford is an unincorporated village in the town of Thetford, Orange County, Vermont, United States. The community is located along the Connecticut River and U.S. Route 5, 11 miles (18 km) north-northeast of Hanover, New Hampshire. North Thetford has a post office, with ZIP code 05054.
