= Burke Mountain Ski Area =

Ski resort in East Burke, Vermont, United States

Burke Mountain
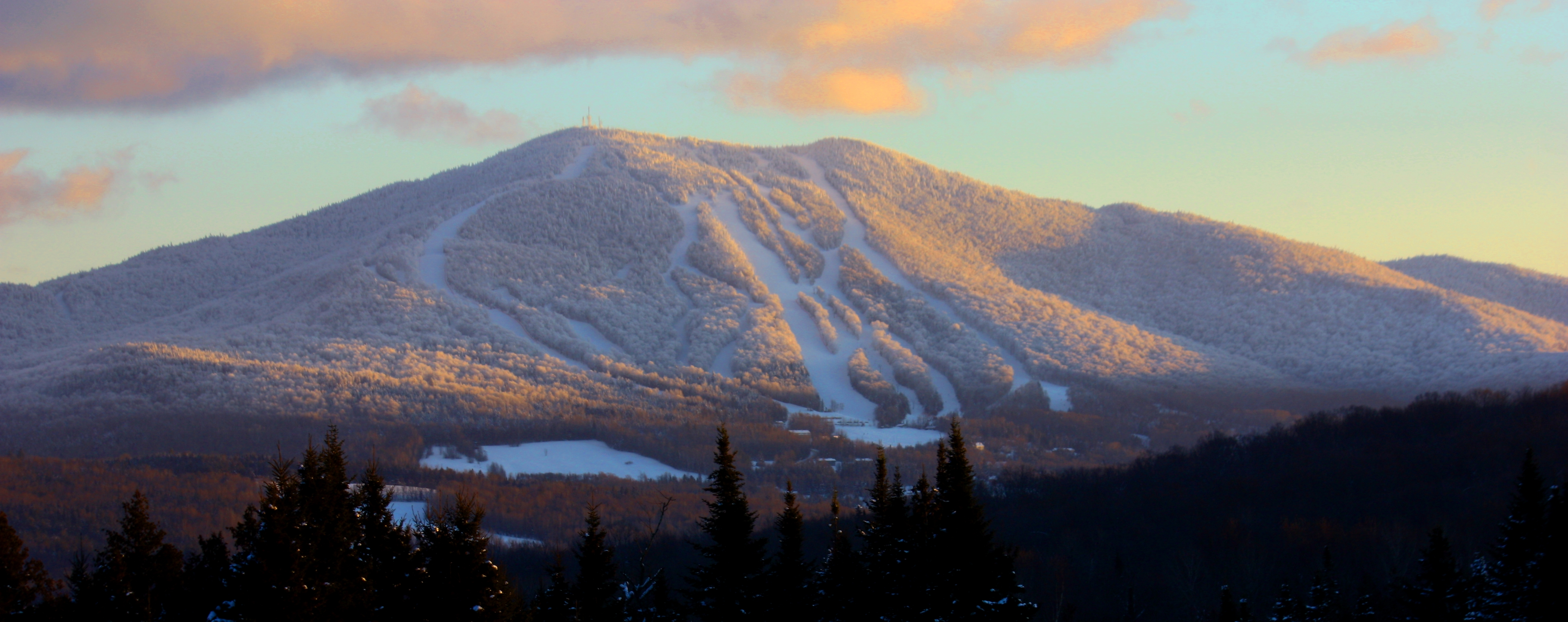
- Interactive map of Burke Mountain
- Location: East Burke, Vermont
- Nearest city: Lyndonville
- Coordinates: 44.57°N 71.895°W
- Vertical: 2,057 ft (627 m)
- Top elevation: 3,267 ft (996 m)
- Base elevation: 1,210 ft (370 m)
- Skiable area: 260 acres (110 ha)
- Trails: 55
- Longest run: 0.9 miles (1.4 km)
- Lift system: 2 High-Speed Quads; 1 J-bar (surface); 1 T-Bar
- Terrain parks: Small Advanced Park (Large hits and Rails); Intermediate Park (Jumps, Rails, Boxes) on Dashney Mile (Lower Mtn.); Beginner Park (Small hits, Berms) on Bunker Hill (Lower Mtn.)
- Snowfall: 217 in (550 cm)
- Snowmaking: 182 acres (74 ha)
- Website: skiburke.com

Burke Mountain Ski resort is a mid-size ski resort open to skiing and snowboarding in northeast Vermont (aka Vermont's "Northeast Kingdom" ). It is located on Burke Mountain and is home to Burke Mountain Academy, a ski academy.

In May 2012, Burke Mountain Resort was purchased by the owners of nearby Jay Peak Resort. In 2016, the resort went into federal receivership during an active investigation that resulted in owner, Ariel Quiros, being sentenced to five years in federal prison in 2022.

The resort was purchased by a group called Bear Den Partners in April 2025 for a reported $11.5 million. While announcing the sale, owners shared their plan to invest as much as $20 million in snowmaking, new lifts, and terrain expansion.

== Trails and Lifts ==
Burke Mountain has two main sections of terrain, and is divided between the lower and upper sections. Both areas are serviced by lifts.

=== Lifts ===
Burke Mountain currently operates two high-speed quad chairlifts, as well as three surface lifts: one J-bar, one T-bar, and one magic carpet.

Former Lifts

=== Photos ===
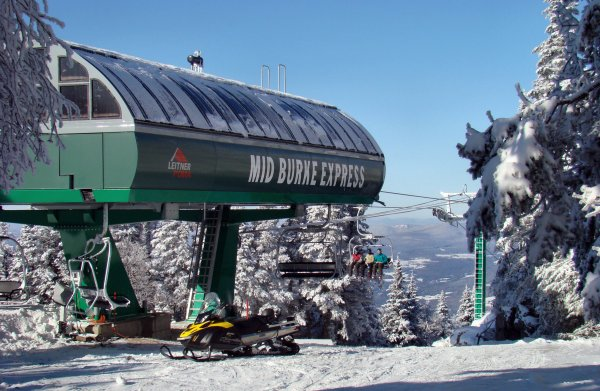
Mid-Burke Express Quad on opening day.

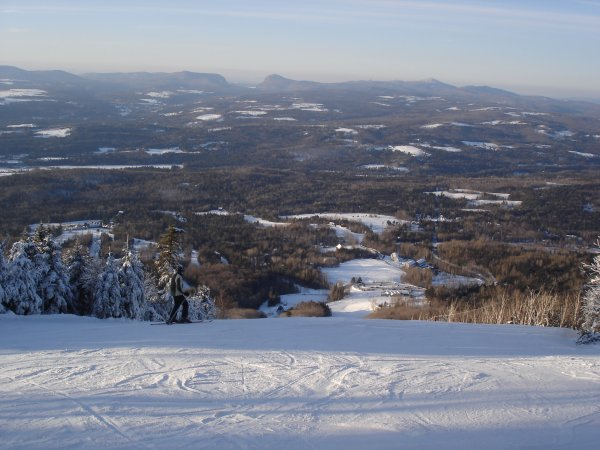
Skiing at Burke

== EB-5 fraud ==
In 2008, a group headed by Miami businessman Ariel Quiros and the CEO of Jay Peak Resort, Bill Stenger, purchased Jay, which was conducting an EB-5 visa program to finance development of the ski area. Quiros persuaded the sellers to put the EB5 funds already raised into an account at Raymond James Financial, which employed his son-in-law, who helped to retitle the accounts in Quiros' name immediately before the closing of the sale of Jay. They transferred the funds to other accounts, misusing the EB-5 funds to pay part of the purchase price; they used more EB-5 funds raised later to complete the payments owed to the seller.

The resort company raised $250 million by 2010, for improvements at Jay and other nearby developments and purchases, including the 2012 purchase of Burke Mountain Ski Area, from 250 investors from 43 companies through the incentive of the federal EB-5 visa. Under this visa, every $500,000 invested in the U.S. that results in ten new jobs gains the investor permanent residence. By 2014, some investors had complained to the Vermont Department of Financial Regulation (DFR) and the U.S. Securities and Exchange Commission (SEC) that the resort company had abruptly reclassified their investments. The investigators found the resort company's answers to their questions about the use of the funds to be evasive. They eventually found that Quiros had diverted millions of the dollars raised for his personal use and that Stenger had lied to investors and the SEC about, among other things, the status of some of the construction projects, some of which were never built, including a biotechnology plant in Newport, Vermont.

On April 14, 2016, Jay Peak and Burke Mountain were seized by U.S. government officials. The resorts remain operational under management of the SEC-designated receiver, Michael Goldberg. The SEC recovered $81 million from Quiros (including the ski area assets), who pleaded guilty in 2020 to federal crimes including wire fraud, money laundering and obstructing investigators. He was sentenced to five years in prison. Stenger cooperated with the investigation and pleaded guilty in 2021 to supplying false statements to federal investigators. He was sentenced to 18 months in prison and three years of supervisory release, and he was fined $250,000. A third conspirator, William Kelly, also received fines and a prison sentence. Raymond James Financial paid a $150 million settlement for its part in the fraud. The EB-5 investors may never receive most of their money back from the investment, but the receiver intends to continue trying to get their green cards approved.
