= Chip Knight =

American alpine skier

Personal information
- Born: January 11, 1975 (age 51) Stamford, Connecticut, U.S.
- Relative: Hilary Knight

Sport
- Country: USA
- Sport: Alpine skiing

Chip Knight (born January 11, 1975) is an American former professional alpine skier. He competed in the 1998 Winter Olympics, 2002 Winter Olympics, and 2006 Winter Olympics. Knight has served as the U.S. Ski & Snowboard Association Alpine Development Director since 2015.

== Early life ==
Knight was born on January 11, 1975, in Stamford, Connecticut, to parents Woody and Bonnie Knight. His family was very involved in athletics; Chip and two other siblings qualified for the U.S. national teams in skiing while his sister Heather runs marathons. As he grew up in Stowe, Vermont, Chip trained at the Mt. Mansfield Ski Club and Burke Mountain Academy.

== Career ==
Knight made his Olympics debut at the 1998 Winter Olympics in Nagano but failed to finish the first run. Upon failing to qualify, he returned to Williams College for his bachelor's degree. He qualified for the 2002 Winter Olympics, where he finished sixth, 0.57 seconds behind gold medalist Ivica Kostelic. By 2006, he ranked just outside the top-30 in the world in slalom and was forced to pay $8,000 toward training costs to train for the U.S. Ski Team. He paid the fee using revenue from his ski school and help from Stowe, Vermont sponsors. He eventually qualified for the national team and posted multiple top-20 results during the tournament.

In June 2010, Knight replaced Christine Booker as the women’s alpine ski coach at Dartmouth College. During his tenure at Dartmouth, he also served as their Director of Skiing and was named the 2015 Alpine Coach of the Year by the Eastern Intercollegiate Ski Association. In April 2015, he was tapped to serve as the USSA Alpine Development Director.

== Personal life ==
Knight lives with his two sons in Park City, Utah. Knight is the first cousin of U.S. women's hockey forward Hilary Knight.
