= Vermont Route 5A =

State highway in northeastern Vermont, US

Vermont Route 5A
- Map of northeastern Vermont with VT 5A highlighted in red

Route information
- Auxiliary route of US 5
- Maintained by VTrans
- Length: 26.397 mi (42.482 km)
- Existed: 1926–present

Major junctions
- South end: US 5 in West Burke
- North end: US 5 / VT 105 in Derby Center

Location
- Country: United States
- State: Vermont
- Counties: Caledonia, Orleans

Highway system
- State highways in Vermont
← US 5	→ US 7
← Route 2	N.E.	→ Route 3

Vermont Route 5A (VT 5A) is a 26.397-mile-long (42.482 km) state highway in extreme northeastern Vermont. It is an alternate route of U.S. Route 5 (US 5) that travels along the east shore of Lake Willoughby. VT 5A begins at US 5 in West Burke and ends at US 5 and VT 105 in Derby Center, about 3 miles (4.8 km) south of the Canada–United States border.

VTrans' 2006 Route Log lists the official length of VT 5A to be 19.498 miles (31.379 km), with the last milepost reading at VT 105 in Charleston. However, VT 5A continues along a silent concurrency with VT 105 from Charleston to Derby Center. The only mention of a concurrency between VT 5A and VT 105 is from VT 111 at its western terminus.

== Route description ==
VT 5A begins in the south at an intersection with US 5 in the village of West Burke. Both routes connect Burke with Derby, but VT 5A uses a more direct, easterly route than US 5. VT 5A proceeds north into Orleans County and the town of Westmore traversing through the Willoughby State Forest and along the eastern side of Lake Willoughby before intersecting with the eastern end of VT 16.

== History ==

While the designation of VT 5A has changed since its initial construction, its routing and function have not. The entirety of modern VT 5A was first designated as New England Interstate Route 2A (NEI 2A), part of the New England road marking system that existed between 1922 and 1927. NEI 2A was designated as an alternate to NEI 2, a designation which covered the entirety of modern US 5. When the New England Interstate system was supplanted by the United States Numbered Highways, NEI 2 was designated as US 5 in 1926 and NEI 2A was redesignated as a state highway.

== Major intersections ==
County	Location	mi	km	Destinations	Notes
Caledonia	Burke	0.000	0.000	US 5 (Lynburke Road) – Lyndonville, St. Johnsbury, Barton	Southern terminus
Orleans	Westmore	11.372	18.301	VT 16 south (Willoughby Lake Road) – Barton	Eastern terminus of VT 16
Orleans	Brownington	12.625	20.318	VT 58 west (Evansville Road) – Evansville, Orleans	Eastern terminus of VT 58
Orleans	Charleston	19.498	31.379	VT 105 east – East Charleston, Island Pond	Southern end of silent concurrency with VT 105
Orleans	Derby	25.890	41.666	VT 111 east – Morgan	Western terminus of VT 111
Orleans	Derby	26.397	42.482	US 5 south / VT 105 west to I-91 – Newport US 5 north (Derby Line Road) – Derby Line	Unsigned northern terminus
1.000 mi = 1.609 km; 1.000 km = 0.621 mi: Concurrency terminus

== Scenic overviews ==
Vermont Route 5A features several scenic overlooks along the eastern shore of Lake Willoughby, including at the Devil's Rock and Mount Pisgah pull-offs. These overlooks provide views of the lake's clear waters and the cliffs that rise on either side.

== See also ==
- List of state highways in Vermont
