= Burke Mountain (Vermont) =

Mountain in Vermont, United States

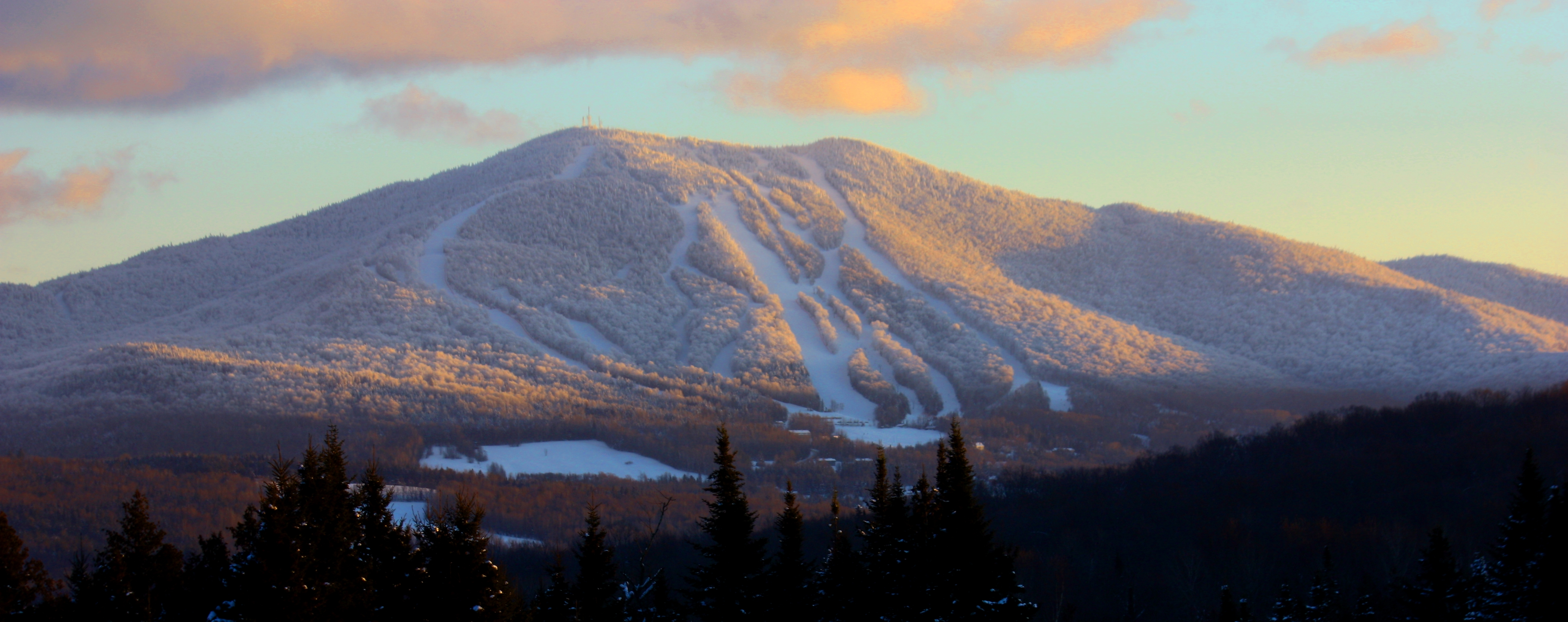

Highest point
- Elevation: 3,270 ft (1,000 m)
- Prominence: 1,600 ft (490 m)
- Coordinates: 44°34.25′N 71°53.59′W

Geography
- Location: Northeast Kingdom, Vermont, U.S.
- Topo map: USGS Burke Mountain

Burke Mountain is a mountain located in the Northeast Kingdom of Vermont. The bulk of the mountain is in Burke and Kirby, Caledonia County, but its southeast side is in Essex County. It is flanked to the east and southeast by Umpire Mountain and Kirby Mountain, respectively.

Burke Mountain stands within the watershed of the Passumpsic River. The northeast and northwest sides of Burke Mountain drain into Dish Mill Brook, thence into the East Branch of the Passumpsic River. The southwest end of Burke Mountain drains into Mountain Brook, thence into the East Branch of the Passumpsic River. The south slopes and southeast side of Burke Mountain drain into Weir Mill Brook, thence into Bog Brook, the Moose River, and the Passumpsic River.

It is within the Darling State Forest Park of Victory State Forest. The Burke Mountain Ski Area has been developed since the 1940s on the northwest slopes of the mountain.

Burke Mountain was purchased by the owners of Jay Peak Resort in Jay, Vermont in 2012. It was announced that Burke would be purchased by a group called Bear Den Partners in April 2025.

== Weather ==
Burke's average annual snowfall is 217 inches (5,500 mm).

== Skiing ==
Burke Mountain Resort has 55 ski trails and 15 glades with 270 acres (110 ha) skiable of terrain and over 100 acres (40 ha) of glades. Among the 55 trails, 11% are designated "Green Circle" (Beginner trails), 47% are "Blue Square" (Intermediate), 33% are "Black Diamond" (Advanced), and 9% are "Double Black Diamond" (Expert). Burke also features three terrain parks. Two of the terrain parks are featured on the lower mountain, (Dashney Mile and Carter Country), with the remaining park (Open Slope) located above the Mid-Burke Lodge.

Burke Mountain Resort has a vertical drop of 2,011 feet (613 m) and has 80% snowmaking. The mountain is serviced by 5 lifts; 2 high speed quads, a t-bar dedicated to serving BMA racers, and a J-bar and magic carpet in the learning area.

== Other mountain activities ==
In wintertime, there are miles of ski-able terrain throughout the NEK (Northeast Kingdom). Burke Mountain is also located on the Vermont Association of Snow Travelers trails, making the resort accessible by snowmobile. Snowmobile rentals are available in the area. Snow biking is done on the Kingdom Trails Nordic trails.

In summertime, there is singletrack biking, Burke Bike Park, hiking, Hang Gliding, Paragliding, golfing, swimming, climbing, horseback riding, canoeing, kayaking, and fishing.

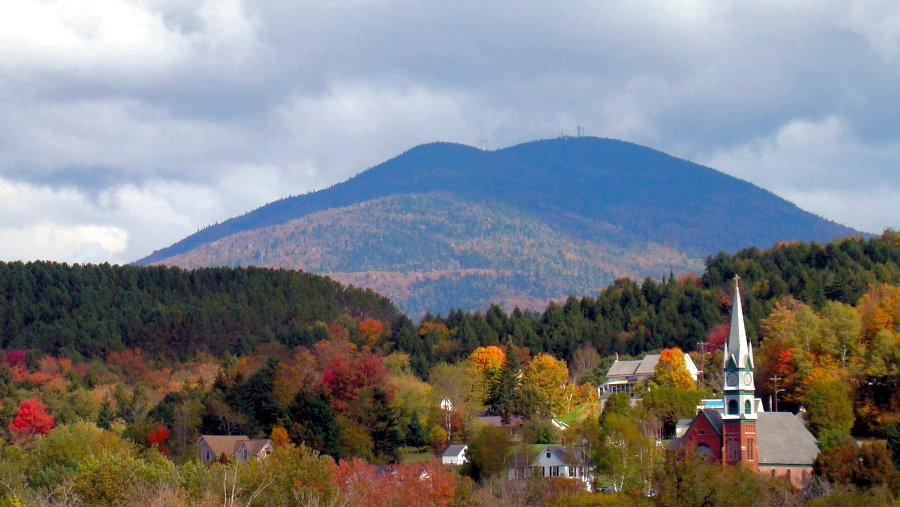
Burke Mountain from Lyndonville

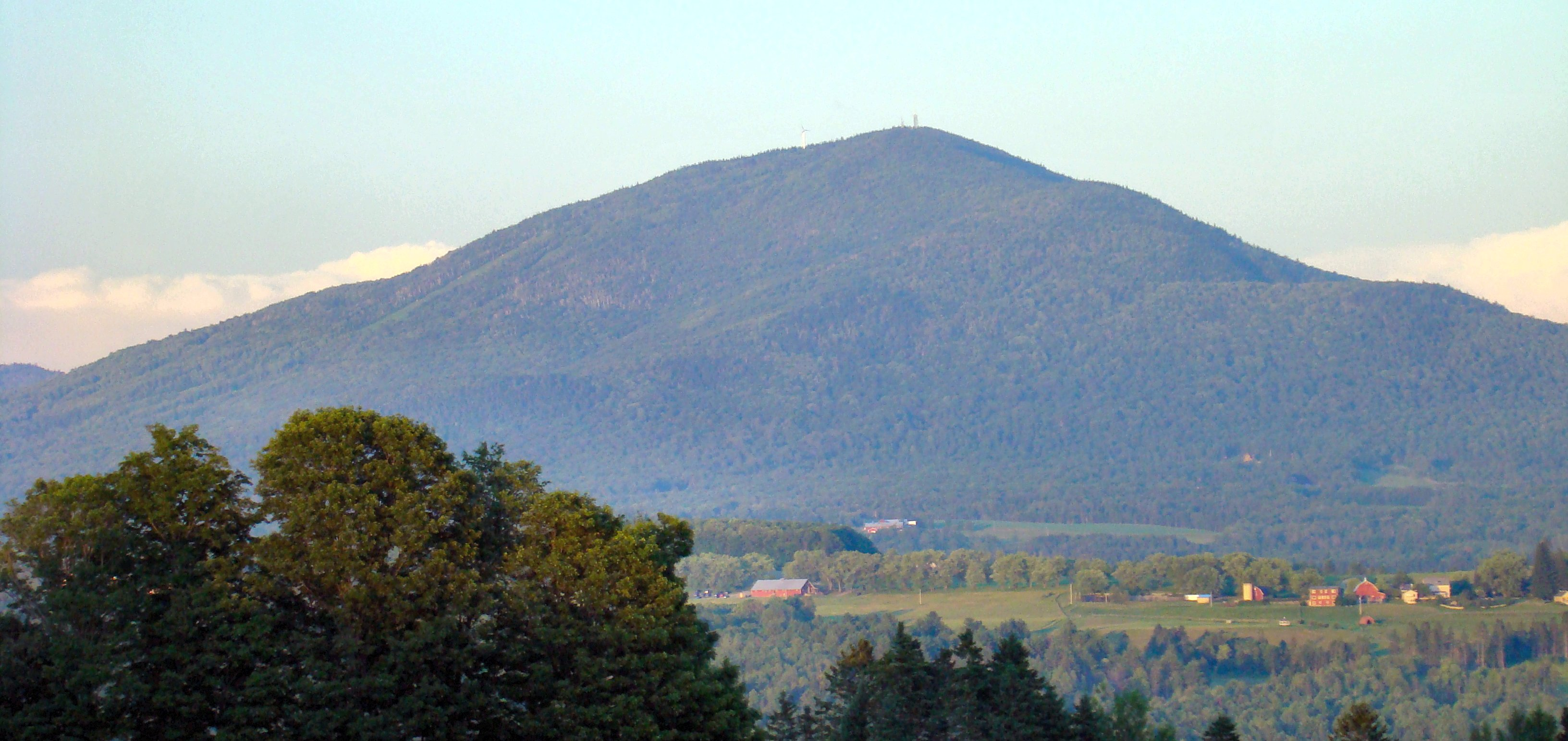
View of the west side of Burke from Pudding Hill in Lyndon.

== See also ==
- List of mountains in Vermont
