= West Burke, Vermont =

- Village
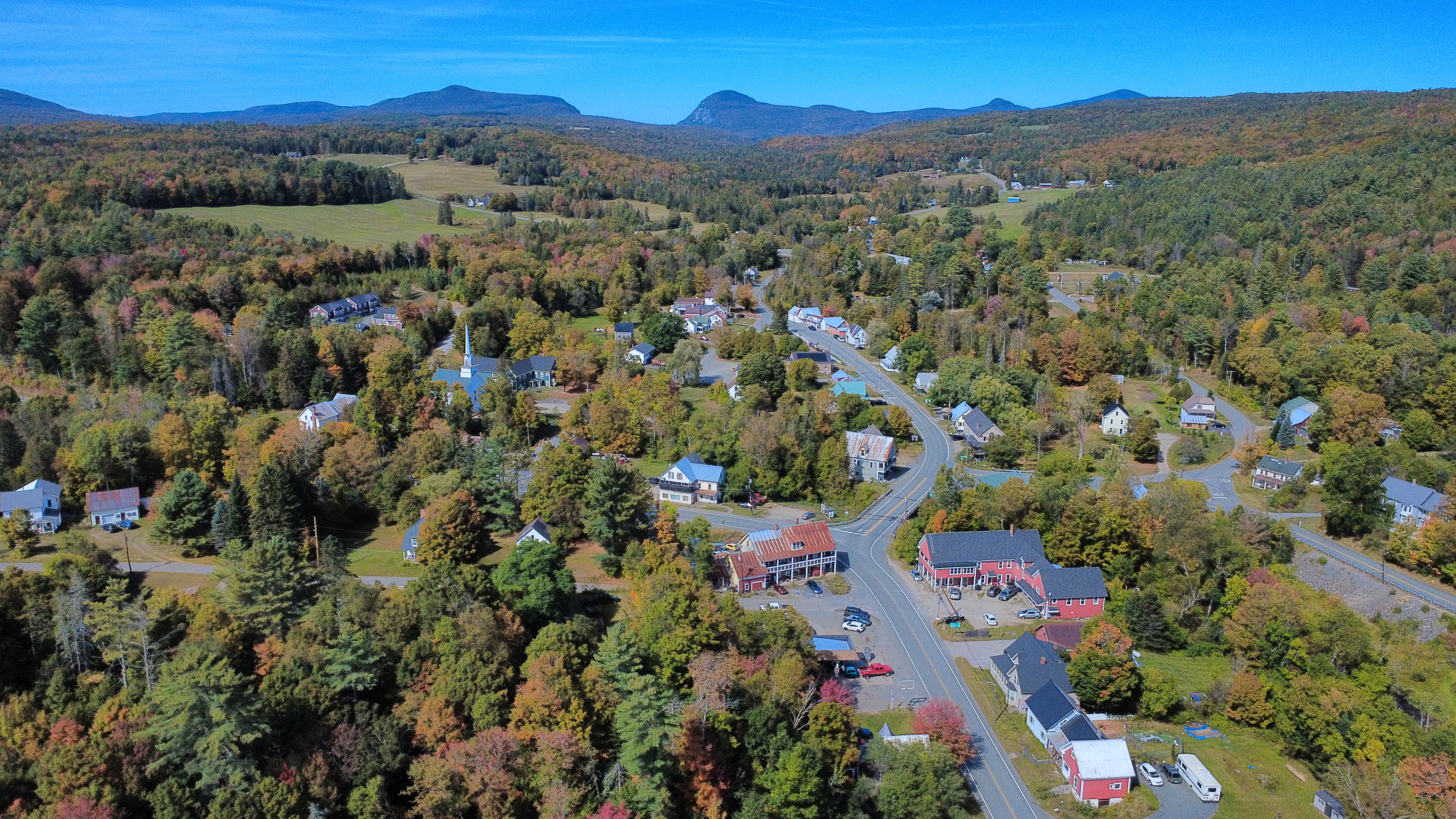
- View of West Burke, VT, with Willoughby Gap visible in the background

- Location within the state of Vermont
- Coordinates: 44°38′35″N 71°58′45″W
- Country: United States
- State: Vermont
- County: Caledonia
- Town: Burke

Area
  - Total: 0.47 sq mi (1.23 km^{2})
  - Land: 0.47 sq mi (1.23 km^{2})
  - Water: 0 sq mi (0.00 km^{2})
- Elevation: 899 ft (274 m)

Population (2020)
  - Total: 281
  - Density: 592/sq mi (228/km^{2})
- Time zone: UTC-5 (Eastern (EST))
  - Summer (DST): UTC-4 (EDT)
- ZIP code: 05871
- Area code: 802
- FIPS code: 50-79150
- GNIS feature ID: 2378331
- Website: www.burkevermont.org

West Burke is a village in the town of Burke, Caledonia County, Vermont, United States. The population was 281 at the 2020 census.

== Geography ==
West Burke is located 8 miles (13 km) north of the village of Lyndonville along U.S. Route 5. Vermont Route 5A intersects US 5 in the center of the village, leading north to Lake Willoughby. The Sutton River flows into the West Branch of the Passumpsic River in the center of the village.

According to the United States Census Bureau, the village has a total area of 0.46 square miles (1.2 km^{2}), all land.

=== Climate ===
Climate data for West Burke, Vermont, 1981–2010 normals, 1948–2017 extremes: 900ft (274m)
Month	Jan	Feb	Mar	Apr	May	Jun	Jul	Aug	Sep	Oct	Nov	Dec	Year
Record high °F (°C)	61 (16)	61 (16)	77 (25)	90 (32)	92 (33)	95 (35)	98 (37)	96 (36)	96 (36)	83 (28)	70 (21)	60 (16)	98 (37)
Mean maximum °F (°C)	43.6 (6.4)	45.5 (7.5)	57.3 (14.1)	73.5 (23.1)	83.7 (28.7)	88.5 (31.4)	90.1 (32.3)	88.3 (31.3)	83.9 (28.8)	73.8 (23.2)	61.4 (16.3)	46.6 (8.1)	90.9 (32.7)
Mean daily maximum °F (°C)	23.8 (−4.6)	28.4 (−2.0)	38.1 (3.4)	52.7 (11.5)	65.9 (18.8)	75.2 (24.0)	79.5 (26.4)	78.1 (25.6)	68.9 (20.5)	55.0 (12.8)	41.4 (5.2)	29.4 (−1.4)	53.0 (11.7)
Daily mean °F (°C)	11.8 (−11.2)	14.5 (−9.7)	24.9 (−3.9)	39.7 (4.3)	51.3 (10.7)	61.2 (16.2)	65.9 (18.8)	64.3 (17.9)	55.7 (13.2)	43.4 (6.3)	32.1 (0.1)	19.5 (−6.9)	40.4 (4.6)
Mean daily minimum °F (°C)	−0.2 (−17.9)	0.6 (−17.4)	11.6 (−11.3)	26.7 (−2.9)	36.7 (2.6)	47.2 (8.4)	52.2 (11.2)	50.4 (10.2)	42.6 (5.9)	31.8 (−0.1)	22.7 (−5.2)	9.6 (−12.4)	27.7 (−2.4)
Mean minimum °F (°C)	−26.5 (−32.5)	−24.6 (−31.4)	−15.0 (−26.1)	9.6 (−12.4)	22.8 (−5.1)	31.0 (−0.6)	37.9 (3.3)	34.7 (1.5)	26.0 (−3.3)	17.4 (−8.1)	3.0 (−16.1)	−17.4 (−27.4)	−30.0 (−34.4)
Record low °F (°C)	−40 (−40)	−41 (−41)	−34 (−37)	−11 (−24)	15 (−9)	19 (−7)	29 (−2)	26 (−3)	19 (−7)	9 (−13)	−12 (−24)	−35 (−37)	−41 (−41)
Average precipitation inches (mm)	2.89 (73)	2.30 (58)	2.75 (70)	2.89 (73)	3.83 (97)	4.11 (104)	4.61 (117)	4.83 (123)	3.54 (90)	4.20 (107)	3.62 (92)	3.32 (84)	42.89 (1,088)
Average snowfall inches (cm)	23.3 (59)	19.0 (48)	15.5 (39)	5.9 (15)	0.0 (0.0)	0.0 (0.0)	0.0 (0.0)	0.0 (0.0)	0.0 (0.0)	0.3 (0.76)	7.5 (19)	20.6 (52)	92.1 (232.76)
Average precipitation days (≥ 0.01 in)	16.1	13.2	13.3	13.2	14.8	14.1	13.4	14.1	13.7	14.9	16.4	16.4	173.6
Average snowy days (≥ 0.1 in)	12.1	8.4	6.9	2.7	0.0	0.0	0.0	0.0	0.0	0.4	4.9	10.8	46.2
Source 1: NOAA
Source 2: XMACIS (records & monthly max/mins)

== Demographics ==
Historical population
Census	Pop.	Note	%±
1910	325		—
1930	359		—
1940	316		−12.0%
1950	414		31.0%
1960	369		−10.9%
1970	358		−3.0%
1980	338		−5.6%
1990	353		4.4%
2000	364		3.1%
2010	343		−5.8%
2020	281		−18.1%
U.S. Decennial Census

As of the census of 2020, there were 281 people and 98 households residing in the village. The population density was 597.9 people per square mile (228.5/km^{2}). There were 150 housing units at an average density of 319.1/sq mi (122.0/km^{2}). The racial makeup of the village was 91.81% White, 1.07% Native American, 0.35% Black/African American, 2.14% Asian, 4.63% Two or More Races. Hispanic or Latino of any race were 1.78% of the population.

There were 98 households, out of which 22.4% were married couples living together, 31.6% had a female householder with no spouse present, and 27.6% had a male householder with no spouse present. In the village, the population was spread out, with 15.3% under the age of 18, 6.76% from 20 to 24, 17.44% from 25 to 44, 41.99% from 45 to 64, and 13.88% who were 65 years of age or older. The median age was 44.9 years. For every 100 females, there were 105.3 males.

The median income for a household in the village was $23,750, and the median income for a family was $44,250. About 34.0% of the population were below the poverty line, including 48.3% of those under age 18 and 35.9% of those age 65 or over.
