= Burke Mountain Academy =

Ski academy in East Burke, Vermont, US

Coordinates: 44.593°N 71.906°W

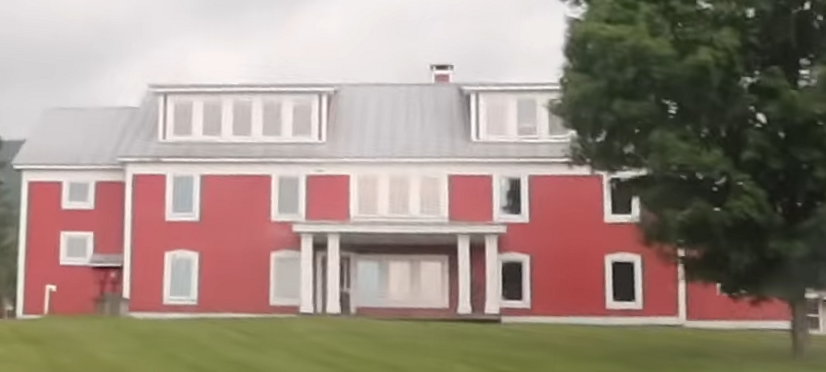
- Front building in summer 2023

Location
- 60 Alpine Lane; East Burke, Vermont, U.S.

Information
- Founded: 1970; 56 years ago
- Founders: Martha Coughlin and Warren Witherell
- Head of school: Willy Booker
- Grades: 7–12, PG
- Enrollment: 66
- Website: http://burkemtnacademy.org/

Burke Mountain Academy is a full-year private college-preparatory school in the northeastern United States, located in East Burke, Vermont. It educates and trains alpine ski racing athletes on the slopes of adjacent Burke Mountain Ski Area.

== Overview ==
Burke Mountain Academy (BMA), located in the Northeast Kingdom of Vermont in Caledonia County, is a full-year private college-preparatory school that educates and trains alpine ski racing athletes on the slopes of nearby Burke Mountain Ski Area.

The school was founded in 1970 when “Martha Coughlin approached coach Warren Witherell seeking year-round training to help her achieve her dream of being named to the U.S. Ski Team.” It was the first ski academy in North America. In 2020, there are numerous ski academies in the U.S. and Canada. BMA has, in addition to alpine ski racers, trained Nordic skiers throughout the school’s 50 year history. As of 2020, the Nordic ski program is on hold.

== Alumni ==
Location in Vermont

=== Notables ===
- Diann Roffe '85
- Shane McConkey ‘88
- Fábio Igel '89
- Julie Parisien '89
- Thomas Grandi '90
- Erik Schlopy '90
- Chip Knight '93
- Liz Stephen '05
- Ida Sargent '06
- Nolan Kasper '07
- Thomas Biesemeyer '08
- Warren Cummings Smith '10
- Mikaela Shiffrin '13
- Nina O'Brien '14
- Moriah Wilson '15
