= East Burke, Vermont =

Census-designated place in Vermont, United States

- Census-designated place
- East Burke, VT, with Burke Mountain in the background

- Location within Vermont
- Coordinates: 44°35′15″N 71°56′25″W
- Country: United States
- State: Vermont
- County: Caledonia
- Town: Burke

Area
  - Total: 0.525 sq mi (1.36 km^{2})
  - Land: 0.525 sq mi (1.36 km^{2})
  - Water: 0 sq mi (0 km^{2})
- Elevation: 909 ft (277 m)

Population (2020)
  - Total: 94
  - Density: 180/sq mi (69/km^{2})
- Time zone: UTC-5 (Eastern (EST))
  - Summer (DST): UTC-4 (EDT)
- ZIP code: 05832
- Area code: 802
- GNIS feature ID: 2586628

East Burke is a census-designated place in the town of Burke in Caledonia County, Vermont, United States. As of the 2020 census, East Burke had a population of 94. It is home to Burke Mountain, Burke Mountain Academy, and the Kingdom Trail Association.
