= U.S. Route 5 =

North-south U.S. route from Connecticut to Vermont

U.S. Route 5
- US 5 highlighted in red

Route information
- Length: 300.338 mi (483.347 km)
- Existed: 1926–present

Major junctions
- South end: I-91 in New Haven, CT
- Route 15 (Wilbur Cross Parkway) in Wallingford, CT and Meriden, CT; I-691 in Meriden, CT; I-91 in Hartford, CT; I-84 / US 6 / US 44 / Route 2 / Route 15 in East Hartford, CT; I-291 in South Windsor, CT; US 20 in West Springfield, MA; I-90 / Mass Pike / I-91 near Springfield, MA; US 4 in White River Junction, VT; US 302 in Newbury, VT; US 2 in St. Johnsbury, VT
- North end: R-143 at the Canadian border in Derby Line, VT

Location
- Country: United States
- States: Connecticut, Massachusetts, Vermont

Highway system
- United States Numbered Highway System; List; Special; Divided
← US 4	US	→ US 6
← Route 4	CT	→ US 6
← Route 4	MA	→ US 6
← VT 4A	VT	→ VT 5A
← NH 4A	NH	→ NH 9
← Route 1A	N.E.	→ Route 2A

U.S. Route 5 (US 5) is a north–south United States Numbered Highway running through the New England states of Connecticut, Massachusetts, and Vermont. Significant cities along the route include New Haven, Connecticut; Hartford, Connecticut; and Springfield, Massachusetts. From Hartford northward to St. Johnsbury, Vermont, the road closely follows the route of the Connecticut River.

The entire route of US 5 is closely paralleled by Interstate 91 (I-91). US 5 now serves as the local business route and alternate route for the Interstate Highway. The northern terminus of US 5 is in Derby Line, Vermont, at the Canada–United States border, where it continues past the Derby Line–Stanstead Border Crossing into Quebec as Route 143, which was Route 5 until renumbered in the mid-1970s. Its southern terminus is in New Haven, Connecticut, at an intersection with I-91.

== Route description ==
Lengths
	mi	km
CT	54.59	87.85
MA	53.432	85.990
VT	192.316	309.503
Total	300.338	483.347

US 5 runs through three states: Connecticut, Massachusetts, and Vermont, with the latter containing over half of US 5's total distance. Throughout nearly all of US 5's entire length, it remains its own road entirely separate from I-91, which has largely replaced it as a through route (and now carries most of the traffic). It is only cosigned onto I-91 for less than half of a mile (0.80 km) in Springfield, Massachusetts, before splitting off alone again.

=== Connecticut ===
US 5 begins in the city of New Haven, heading north through Hartford to Massachusetts. It generally parallels I-91. From Meriden northward through Wethersfield, it runs concurrent with Route 15 and is known locally as the Berlin Turnpike. Much commerce is located there resulting in high traffic. The Berlin Turnpike leaves the roadway south of the Hartford city line.

After an interchange in Hartford with I-91, US 5/Route 15 travels over the Charter Oak Bridge, which spans the Connecticut River, into East Hartford. US 5 then splits off to head toward downtown East Hartford. It then has a short overlap with US 44, which joins it from the west as Connecticut Boulevard. US 44 continues to the east along Burnside Avenue as US 5 continues northward into South Windsor, East Windsor, and Enfield. It leaves the state soon after a junction with I-91, heading into Longmeadow, Massachusetts (a part of the Springfield metropolitan area).

=== Massachusetts ===
US 5 stays very close to the Connecticut River. It enters the state at the town of Longmeadow on the east bank of the river going up to Springfield. In Springfield, US 5 then overlaps with I-91 for about 0.5 miles (0.8 km), then separates as its own freeway crossing the Connecticut River on the South End Bridge into Agawam. The freeway portion runs for about 3.3 miles (5.3 km) up to West Springfield. From the town of Northampton up to Bernardston, US 5 overlaps Route 10 (for 26 miles [42 km]). US 5 also passes through Holyoke, Hatfield, Whately, Deerfield, and Greenfield. As in Connecticut, US 5 has many interchanges with the parallel I-91.

=== Vermont ===
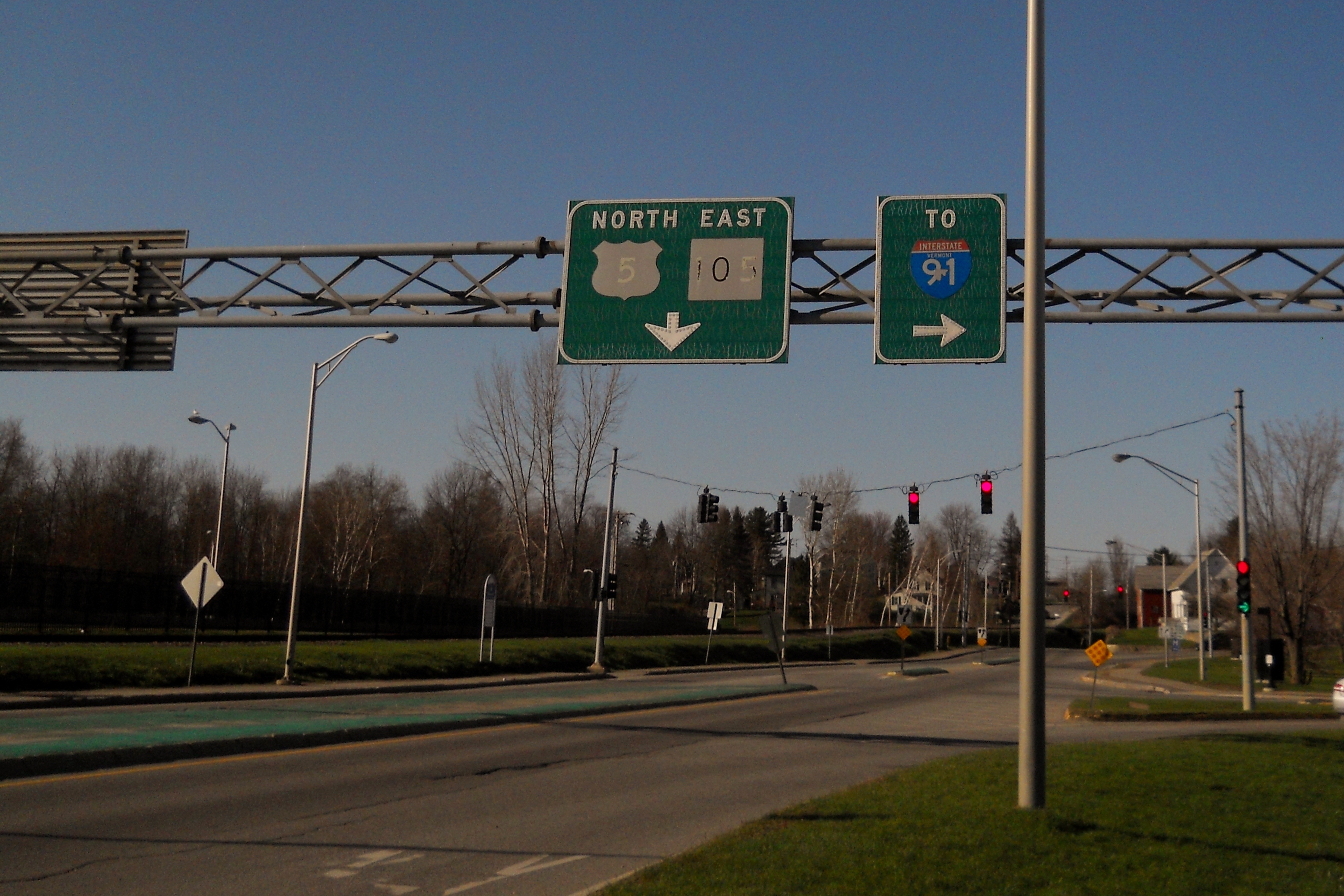
US 5 in Newport, Vermont, at the junction of Vermont Route 191 heading toward I-91.

US 5 follows the Connecticut River valley from the southern border of Vermont, traveling along the west bank of that river until it reaches St. Johnsbury.

US 5 enters the state at the town of Guilford. It passes through the counties of (from south to north) Windham, Windsor, Orange, Caledonia, and Orleans. Near the town of St. Johnsbury, US 5 continues northward, following the Passumpsic River valley until it reaches Sheffield Heights. After crossing the heights, it follows the Barton River valley until it reaches Orleans. It then turns north-northwest and crosses the divide near the Airport Road in Irasburg and follows the Black River valley into Newport. US 5 ends at the Canada–United States border in the village of Derby Line, where the roadway continues into Canada as Route 143.

As in Connecticut and Massachusetts, US 5 has many interchanges with I-91, with a total of 22 junctions over its 192-mile (309 km) length in the state.

== History ==

Prior to the U.S. Numbered Highway System, the route was designated as Route 2 of the New England road marking system that existed between 1922 and 1927. When US 5 was first commissioned, it took over the entirety of Route 2. In 1927, US 5 had still not been paved in Vermont. Paving in Vermont was completed by 1933.

=== Connecticut ===
Originally, the route began at the New Haven Green in downtown New Haven (at US 1). Between New Haven and North Haven, it originally ran east of the Quinnipiac River along modern-day Middletown Avenue (part of Route 17) and Route 103 (the modern alignment was then designated as US 5A).

In Hartford, US 5 passed by Central Row in the downtown area, entering the city via Maple Avenue and exiting on the Bulkeley Bridge with US 6.

The southern terminus of US 5 has been realigned several times. By 1938, US 5 bypassed downtown New Haven via the Prospect Hill, Dixwell, and West River neighborhoods, ending at Davenport and Columbus Avenues. In the mid-1950s, US 5 was instead routed through the Mill River neighborhood ending at East Street and Forbes Avenue. The modern New Haven to North Haven designation was also in place around this time. When I-91 opened in 1967, the alignment was truncated to its current terminus at exit 5 of I-91.

=== Massachusetts ===
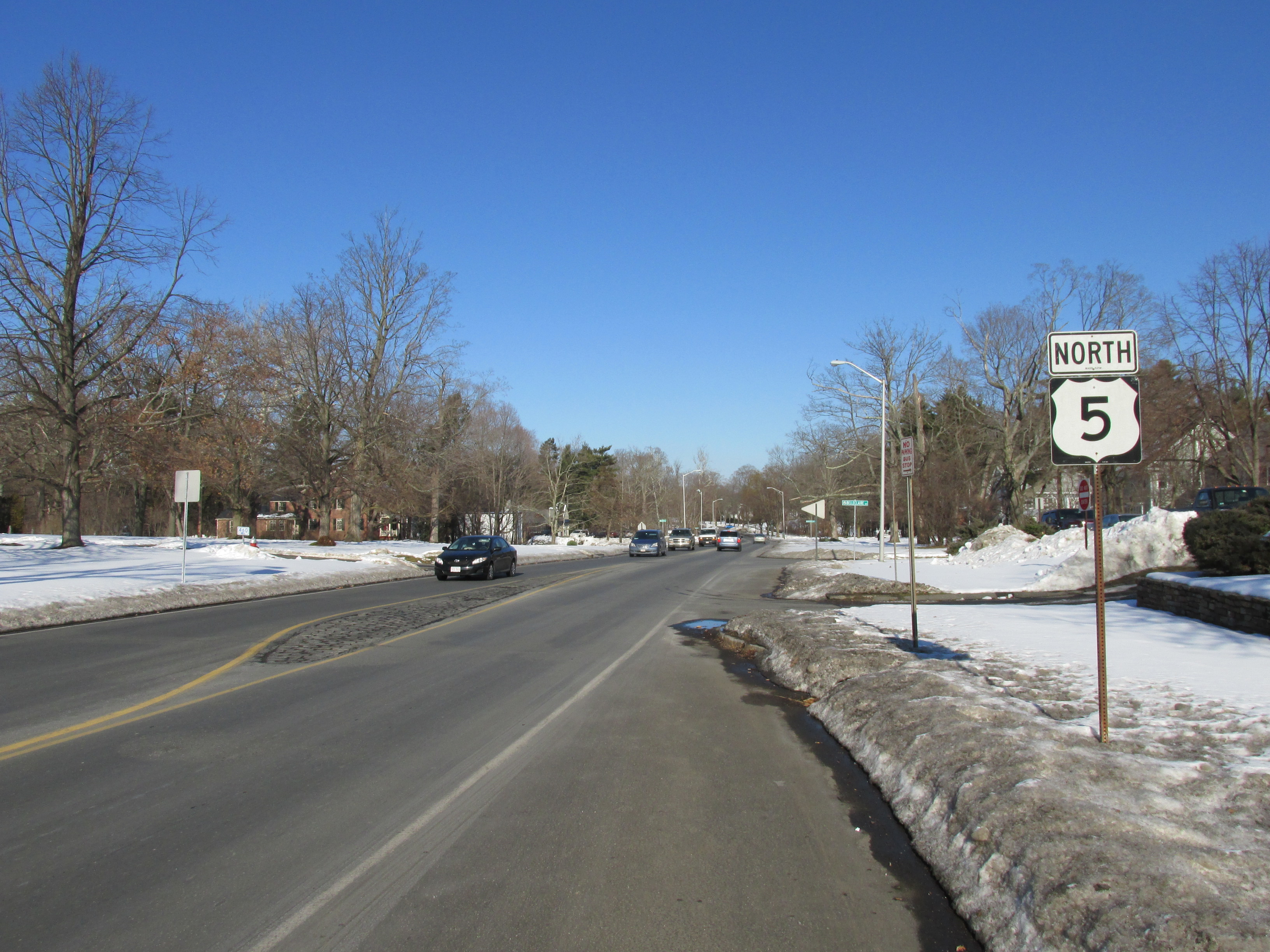
Northbound in Longmeadow, Massachusetts

The Massachusetts Highway Commission noted in 1912 that between Longmeadow and Agawam, the traffic between the Pioneer Valley and Connecticut was heavier on the east side.

The western route from Hartford to West Springfield, via what is now River Road in Agawam and Route 159 in Connecticut, was designated US 5 Alternate.

The main route, US 5, was originally designated to run on the east side of the river from Hartford into downtown Springfield, over the Memorial Bridge, along Memorial Avenue, up a four-lane Main Street, and then to Park Street (and Park Avenue going in the opposite direction), and up what is now Elm Street, to Riverdale Street. Riverdale Street at that time followed the northern part of the current Elm Street and ended at Witch Path.

In 1938, due to congestion in the West Springfield town center, US 5 was moved to a newly constructed bypass from the North End Bridge to East Elm Street, where it continued north along the modern Elm Street and Riverdale Road.

In 1941–1942, a four-lane highway was built from East Elm Street to the current Elm Street fork just south of Morgan Road. The designations of both Riverdale Road and US 5 were moved to the new more easterly route.

In 1952–1953, construction was started on the modern four-lane highway from the new South End Bridge in Agawam to the existing bypass at the North End Bridge. Tunnels were built under the rotaries at the Memorial and North End bridges so US 5 traffic and local traffic would not intersect. In 1971, the Riverdale Road portion of US 5 was upgraded to a divided highway, with the installation of a steel median, and in 1987–1988, a new lane was added to accommodate the new Riverdale Shops at Daggett Drive.

The 1953 Massachusetts Department of Public Works Master Plan would have relocated US 5 between Morgan Road in West Springfield and Mount Tom in Holyoke to a right-of-way similar to the current path of I-91, but this was never implemented.

=== Vermont ===
US 5 in Vermont mostly followed the Route 2 alignment when it was first designated. Minor deviations from the current route are found in the urban compacts of White River Junction, Burke, Coventry, and Derby Center.

From 1927 to 1929, US 5 was temporarily routed into New Hampshire along part of what is now New Hampshire Route 12 between North Walpole and Charlestown. The US 5 designation was removed when the road opposite the Connecticut River in Vermont had been improved. In 1931, US 5 in Vermont was taken over by the state, which began paving the road. Over the years a few minor reroutings within populated centers have taken place. The current alignment was in place by 1975.

== Major intersections ==
Connecticut
I-91 in New Haven
I-91 in North Haven
I-91 in North Haven
I-691 in Meriden
I-91 in Hartford
I-84 / US 6 in East Hartford
US 44 in East Hartford. The highways travel concurrently through the city.
I-291 in South Windsor
I-91 in East Windsor
I-91 in Enfield
I-91 in Enfield
Massachusetts
I-91 in Springfield. The highways travel concurrently through the city.
US 20 in West Springfield
I-91 in West Springfield
I-90 / I-91 in West Springfield
US 202 in Holyoke
I-91 in Northampton
I-91 in Northampton
I-91 in Northampton
I-91 in Hatfield
I-91 in Whately
I-91 in Whately
Vermont
I-91 in Brattleboro
I-91 in Dummerston
I-91 southeast of Springfield
I-91 in Hartland
I-91 in Hartford
US 4 in White River Junction. The highways travel concurrently through the city.
I-91 in Norwich
US 302 in Newbury. The highways travel concurrently through the city.
I-91 in St. Johnsbury
US 2 in St. Johnsbury. The highways travel concurrently for one block.
I-91 in Lyndon
I-91 in Orleans
I-91 in Derby
R-143 at the Canada–United States border in Derby Line

== Special routes ==
- U.S. Route 5 Alternate (St. Johnsbury, Vermont)
- U.S. Route 5 Alternate (Derby Line, Vermont)
- U.S. Route 5 Alternate (Newport, Vermont)

== See also ==
- Connecticut Route 103
- Route 159 (Connecticut–Massachusetts)
- Berlin Turnpike
- Vermont Route 5A
- New England road marking system
