= Lyndonville, Vermont =

- Village
- View of Lyndonville, with Burke Mountain in the background

- Location within the state of Vermont
- Coordinates: 44°32′07″N 72°00′02″W
- Country: United States
- State: Vermont
- County: Caledonia
- Town: Lyndon

Area
  - Total: 0.73 sq mi (1.90 km^{2})
  - Land: 0.71 sq mi (1.83 km^{2})
  - Water: 0.027 sq mi (0.07 km^{2})
- Elevation: 715 ft (218 m)

Population (2020)
  - Total: 1,167
  - Density: 1,650/sq mi (638/km^{2})
- Time zone: UTC-5 (Eastern (EST))
  - Summer (DST): UTC-4 (EDT)
- ZIP code: 05851
- Area code: 802
- FIPS code: 50-41950
- GNIS feature ID: 2378313
- Website: www.lyndonvt.org

Lyndonville is a village in the town of Lyndon, in Caledonia County, Vermont, United States. Lyndonville's population was 1,136 at the 2020 census.

== History ==
In 1883, trustees purchased a hand fire engine from Franklin, New Hampshire, to start a fire fighting company. The fire department volunteers named themselves the "Tiger Fire Company No. 1" and appear in parade uniform for photos starting in 1889.

In 1931, a Boston paper reported that the town had become a haven for "Rum Running Gangsters!"

In 2023, Governor Phil Scott signed a bill into law to disincorporate the village and integrate it and its government with the town of Lyndon.

== Geography ==
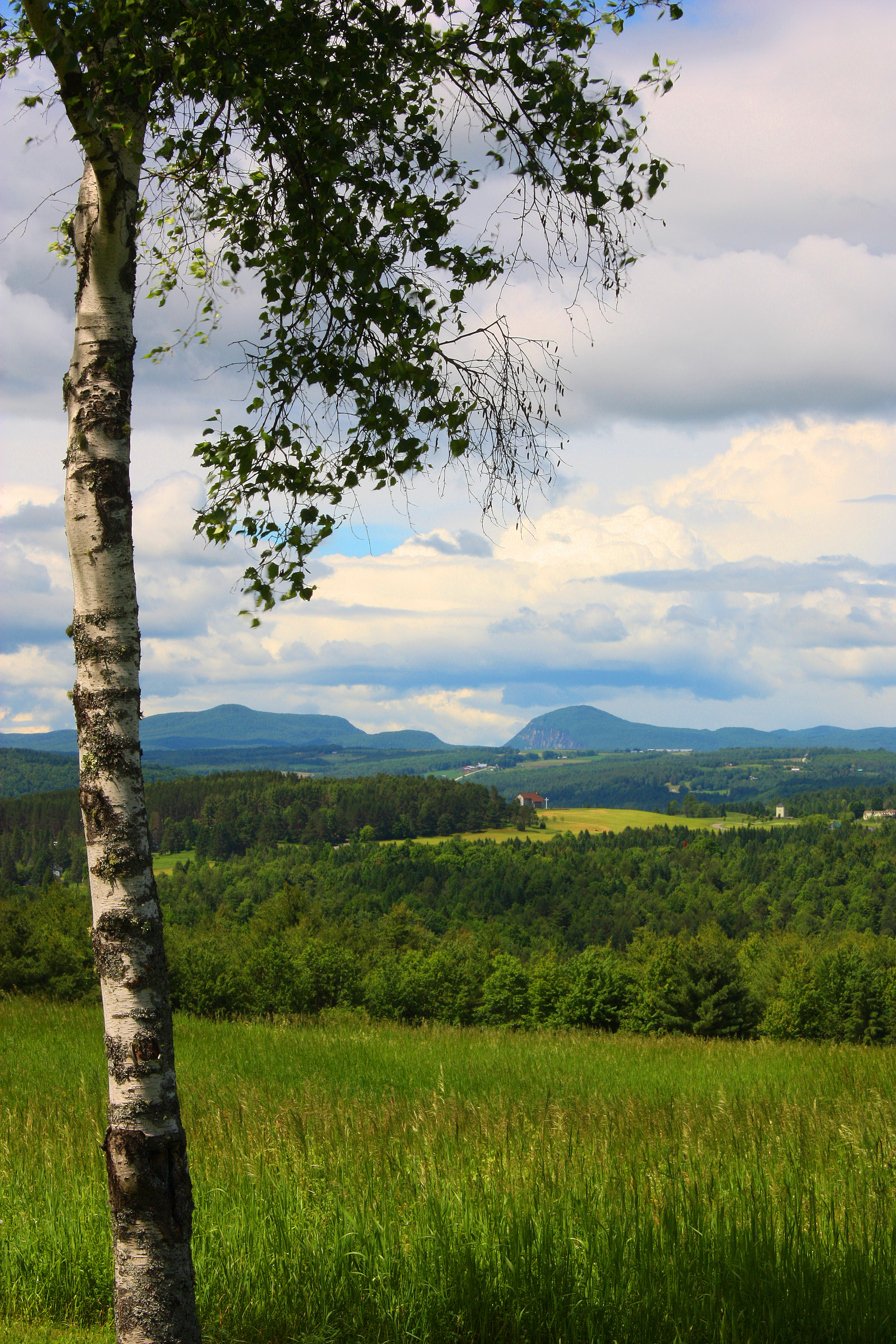
View north from Lyndon

According to the United States Census Bureau, the village has a total area of 0.73 square miles (1.9 km^{2}), of which 0.69 square miles (1.8 km^{2}) is land and 0.04 square miles (0.1 km^{2}), or 3.66%, is water, consisting of the Passumpsic River, which flows along the western edge of the village.

Lyndonville is located 8 miles (13 km) north of St. Johnsbury and 35 miles (56 km) south of Newport, Vermont. U.S. Route 5 passes through the center of the village, and Interstate 91 bypasses it to the west, with access via Exit 23.

== Government ==
In 2007, voters at first decided to merge with the town of Lyndon by dissolving the village government, but a re-vote rescinded this decision.

Police and fire coverage are provided by the Lyndonville Fire Department and Lyndonville Police Department that has four full-time officers as well as supplemental coverage from the Vermont State Police.

Lyndonville is the muster point for the 5th Battalion of the Vermont State Guard.

== Demographics ==
Historical population
Census	Pop.	Note	%±
1880	788		—
1890	606		−23.1%
1900	1,274		110.2%
1910	1,573		23.5%
1920	1,878		19.4%
1930	1,559		−17.0%
1940	1,444		−7.4%
1950	1,506		4.3%
1960	1,477		−1.9%
1970	1,415		−4.2%
1980	1,401		−1.0%
1990	1,255		−10.4%
2000	1,227		−2.2%
2010	1,207		−1.6%
2020	1,136		−5.9%
U.S. Decennial Census

As of the census of 2010, there were 1,207 people, 556 households, and 276 families residing in the village. The population density was 1,724.3 people per square mile (670.6/km^{2}). There were 618 housing units at an average density of 882.9/sq mi (343.3/km^{2}). The racial makeup of the village was 95.3% White, 0.7% African American, 0.3% Native American, 1.3% Asian, 0.5% some other race, and 1.8% from two or more races. Hispanic or Latino of any race were 2.1% of the population.

There were 556 households, out of which 26.1% had children under the age of 18 living with them, 30.0% were headed by a husband-wife couple, 15.3% had a female householder with no husband present, and 50.4% were non-families. 34.4% of all households were made up of individuals, and 14.6% were someone living alone who was 65 years of age or older. The average household size was 2.17, and the average family size was 2.74.

In the village, the population was spread out, with 19.6% under the age of 18, 18.3% from 18 to 24, 23.9% from 25 to 44, 22.4% from 45 to 64, and 15.7% who were 65 years of age or older. The median age was 32.7 years. For every 100 females, there were 93.1 males. For every 100 females age 18 and over, there were 88.3 males.

== Economy ==
=== Personal income ===
For the period 2007–2011, the estimated median household income in the village was $34,250, and the median income for a family was $37,351. Male full-time workers had a median income of $36,337 versus $22,768 for females. The per capita income for the village was $18,976. About 13.9% of families and 19.7% of the population were below the poverty line, including 15.5% of those under age 18 and 19.4% of those age 65 or over.

=== Industry ===
The Dairy Association Company manufactures Bag Balm.

Kennametal employed 200 people locally and closed in 2014.

=== Tourism ===
A community fair has been held annually continuously since 1932. In 2009, Boston magazine named it one of 15 "Best Small Towns" in New England.

== Education ==
- Elementary school - Lyndon Town School
- High school - Lyndon Institute
- College - Vermont State University-Lyndon

== Arts and culture ==
The town has a bronze statue, a copy of the Florentine Boar by Tacca, which is also a fountain. As water gushes continually from the pig's mouth, the local copy is known fondly as the "puking pig".

== Notable people ==
- Walter H. Cleary, Chief Justice of the Vermont Supreme Court
- Moses Pendleton, choreographer and founder of Momix
- Ashley Wheeler, 2008 Miss Vermont
