= Beebe Plain =

Divided unincorporated village on Canada-USA border

Coordinates: 45°0.4′N 72°8.47′W

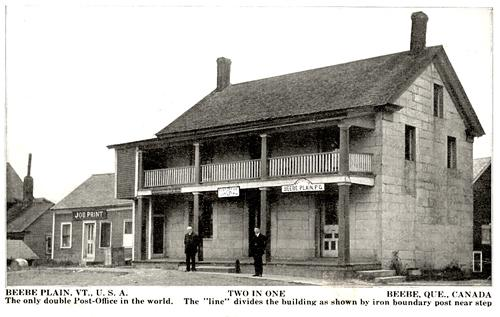
Original divided post office, around 1900.

Beebe Plain is an unincorporated geographically-contiguous settlement, split politically between Canada and the United States. An unincorporated village partially in Stanstead and partially in Derby Line, it is divided by the Quebec-Vermont border. This settlement was begun by David and Calvin Beebe in 1798.

The Beebe Plain–Beebe Border Crossing, a road international border crossing, is located in this settlement.

== History ==
This was once a single village, established soon after the Treaty of Paris (1783) had provided for 45⁰N to be Vermont's northern boundary, but well before surveyors had determined the border's location. The original International Boundary Commission charged with surveying and mapping the boundary was a creation of later treaties. Its survey, completed in the post-1812 era, missed the 45⁰N line by anywhere from a kilometre to a mile through much of the region, dividing the village in two instead of placing it primarily in Canada.

A saw mill was established as the town's first industry in 1863. The first post office was established in 1864, directly on the international boundary. Until the early 1900s the Canadian and US post offices were in opposite sides of the same building - a former store built in the 1820s. Both were served by the same postmaster, but a letter from one side of the building to the other took a 320-kilometre (200-mile) path by rail through both White River Junction, Vermont and Sherbrooke, Quebec. By 1869, Beebe Plain had a church, two stores, a post office, a customs post and some houses.

== Geography ==
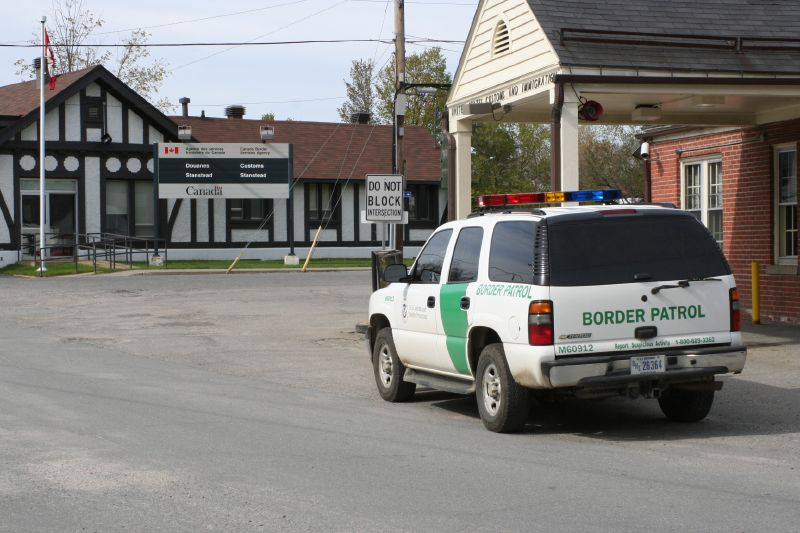
Border vehicles at the US-Canada border

Canusa Street (Quebec Route 247), the border between the two countries, runs through the middle of the village. Homes on the south side of Canusa Street are in the United States; their residents must obtain passports and report to Customs to leave their driveways.

The Canadian portion of this divided village held the status of incorporated municipality (in Quebec) prior to its annexation to Stanstead, Quebec in 1995. As of 1991, the last census before municipal amalgamation, Beebe Plain housed 975 Canadians. While the US side of the village is at most comparable in size, it was not incorporated as a municipality and is therefore not broken out from the rest of Derby Line, Vermont for census purposes.

== Transport ==
Beebe Plain was the border crossing for the Massawippi Valley Railway, a short line railway established 1870 between Lennoxville, Quebec and an 1867 Connecticut and Passumpsic Rivers Railroad line which ran through Newport, Vermont to the border. Part of the Quebec Central Railway from 1926, the line was abandoned by CP in 1990 and removed in 1992. Much of the former railway's path is now bicycle or nature trails. The railway's international boundary crossing has been closed, leaving a gap in the trail between Main Street (rue Principale) and the US border. The old rail station and the original post office still stand, used as private homes.

== Economy ==
The granite industry is the major force in the area's economic history; the stone has been transported to distant cities both for memorials and for architectural use. Landmarks such as the Sun Life Building in Montréal contain Beebe granite or Stanstead grey granite.

Rock of Ages, a local manufacturer of granite monuments and tombstones, is in Canada near the international boundary and the main street. It is the principal local industry, owned by New England's Swenson Granite Works. Many residents of Beebe worked at Butterfield, a tool-and-die maker whose Rock Island factory was literally on the border with Derby Line with eight hundred workers in two nations; that facility closed in 1982.

== See also ==
- Beebe Plain as part of the municipality of Stanstead, Quebec, Canada
- Beebe Plain as an unincorporated part of the town of Derby, Vermont, United States
- Beebe Junction, an international boundary crossing on the (defunct) Massawippi Valley Railway in Beebe Plain, Québec
- Beebe Plain–Beebe Border Crossing, international border crossing station
