= Derby Line–Rock Island Border Crossing =

Canada–United States border crossing

Derby Line-Rock Island Border Crossing, Stanstead 55
- Canada Border Inspection Station at Rock Island, Quebec

Location
- Country: United States; Canada
- Location: Northern terminus of I-91; Souithern terminus of A-55; US Port: Interstate 91 Derby Line, Vermont 05830; Canadian Port: 2 Autoroute 55, Stanstead, Quebec J0B 3E2
- Coordinates: 45.005859°N 72.087961°W

Website
- US https://www.cbp.gov/contact/ports/derby-line-vermont-0209 CAN https://www.cbsa-asfc.gc.ca/do-rb/offices-bureaux/756-eng.html

The Derby Line–Rock Island Border Crossing is a road crossing that connects the town of Stanstead, Quebec, with Derby Line, Vermont, on the Canada–United States border. It is where Interstate 91 intersects with Quebec Autoroute 55. While there historically have been many roads that have connected these two communities along the border, this particular crossing was established in 1965 with the completion of this section Interstate 91. Since 2009, barricades have been erected on Church Street, Lee Street and Ball Street to prevent people from crossing the border at locations where border inspection services are not present, forcing locals to cross at this crossing, or at the Derby Line–Stanstead Border Crossing to the west.

== Rock Island ==
The town of Rock Island, Quebec, was incorporated in 1957, and for many years the Canada border station at this location shared its name. The town was dissolved in 1995 when it was merged with Stanstead Plain, Quebec and Beebe Plain, Quebec to create the town of Stanstead, Quebec (not to be confused with the township of Stanstead, Quebec). In 2009, CBSA officially renamed this port of entry "Stanstead 55".

== Derby Line ==
The current U.S.-bound port of entry was built in the 1960s and encompasses four inspection lanes. CBP sometimes calls this border station "Derby Line I-91" to avoid confusion with the crossing on U.S. Route 5. The facility is in the middle of a multi-year renovation project that will increase the processing capabilities while reducing its ecological footprint.

== In popular culture ==
This border crossing was featured in the Neil Currie novel The Stanstead Incident which is a fictional account involving Canadian domestic terrorism.

== See also ==
- List of Canada–United States border crossings
