= Beebe Plain (disambiguation) =

Beebe Plain is a divided village on the Quebec-Vermont border.

Beebe Plain may also refer to:

- Beebe Plain, Quebec, the Canadian part of the village, now part of Stanstead
- Beebe Plain, Vermont, the American part of the village, an unincorporated community
- Beebe Junction on the Massawippi Valley Railway
