= Tomifobia Nature Trail =

Hiking trail in Quebec, Canada

Coordinates: 45.1526°N 72.0485°W

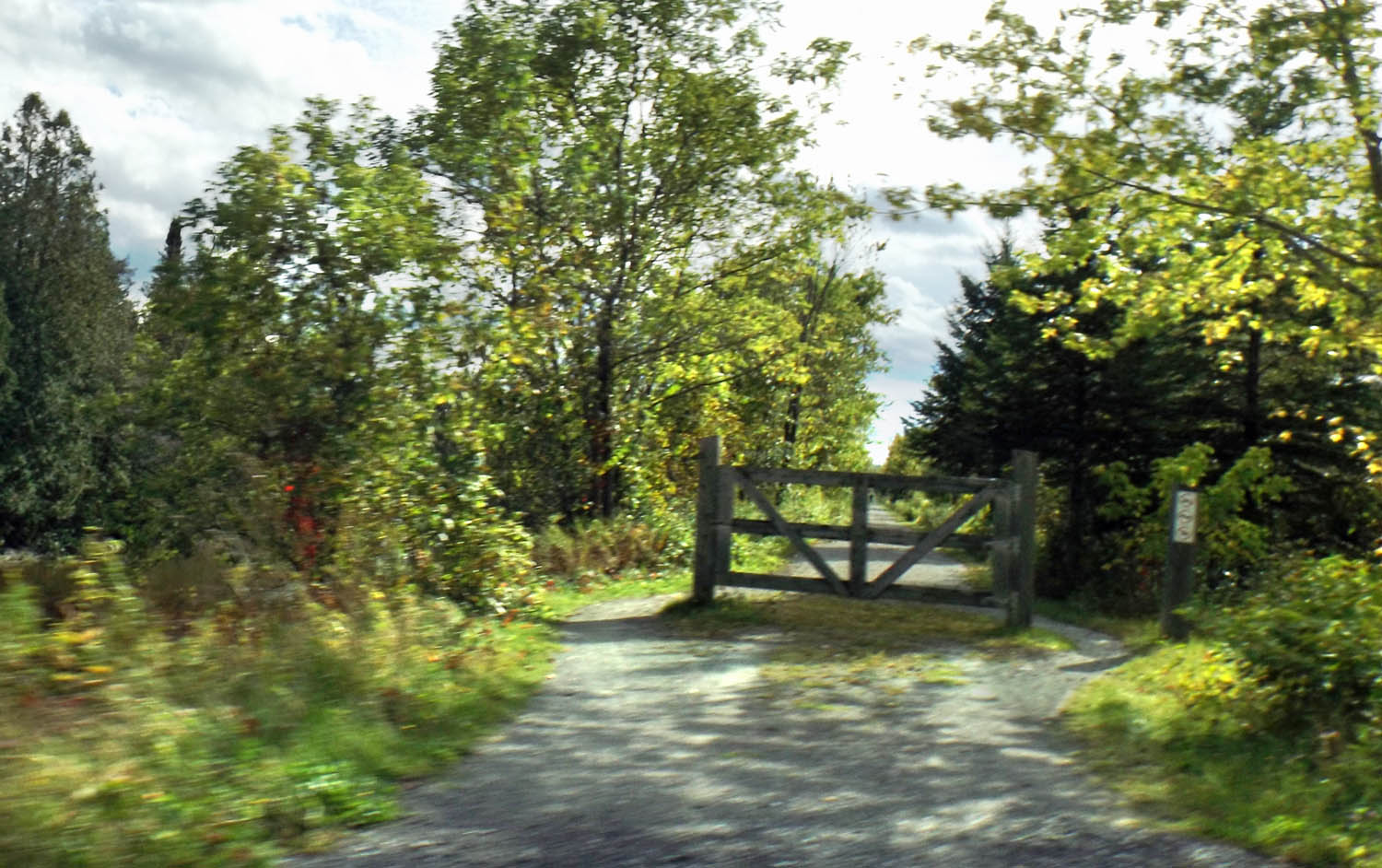
Tomifobia Trail near Ayer's Cliff

The Tomifobia Nature Trail (French: Sentier Nature Tomifobia) is a 19 km rail trail in the Eastern Townships region of Quebec. It follows the old route of a Canadian Pacific railway from Ayer's Cliff to Stanstead. In between, it passes through parts of Stanstead-Est, Stanstead Township, and Ogden.

The trail is made of a gravel surface, and is open for cyclists, hikers, and cross-country skiers. It closes for maintenance between mid-March and mid-May every two years. The trail is privately owned and maintained by the Sentiers Massawippi nonprofit organization, which is funded by private donations, corporate partners and funds from surrounding municipalities.

The trail was completely converted for touristic purposes after the removal of the railway tracks in 1992; however, parts of it were already informally used by hikers for a decade prior to opening. The last Quebec Central revenue freight train to use the line was on December 5, 1988(the last Canadian Pacific train, a detour freight, ran on November 29, 1988).

== Wildlife and nature ==
The trail is populated by hundreds of species and plants. Travelers often encounter wildlife including tortoises, herons, beavers, grass snakes, falcons and deer. More rarely, depending on the season, one may also encounter occasional black bears, moose, coyotes and red foxes.

== Trail connections ==
To the southwest, a minor trail follows Chemin de North Derby, and terminates right across the border from North Derby. Another trail starts in North Derby and reaches Newport, but one must clear U.S. customs at either Route 247 or Route 143 in order to access it. To the southeast, another gravel trail takes cyclists to Stanstead and Stanstead Plain, ending at Rue Maple.

To the north, access to other trails is difficult, and is done by Routes 208, 143, Chemin du Lac, Chemin de Hatley, Chemin de Hatley Centre, Chemin Massawippi and Rue Main to reach Sentier Massawippi, connecting North Hatley to the Lennoxville borough of Sherbrooke. Route 143 remains dangerous as it has no paved shoulder, and its maximum speed is 90 km/h. The other option is to reach Magog via Route 141, Chemin Benoit, and Route 108.
