= Beebe Plain–Beebe Border Crossing =

Canada–United States border crossing

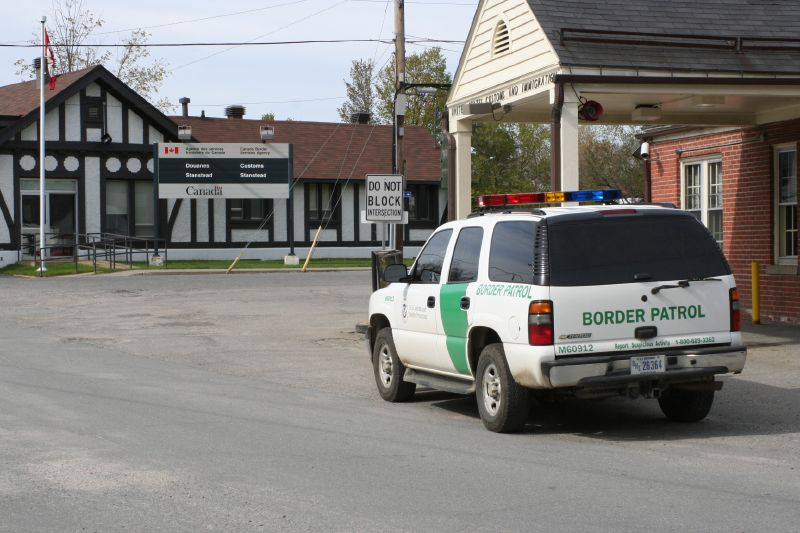
- US-Canada Border at Beebe

Location
- Country: United States; Canada
- Location: The intersection of R-247 (Rue Principale) and Beebe Road; US Port: Beebe Road, Beebe Plain, Vermont 05823; Canadian Port: 2 Principale Street, Stanstead, Quebec J0B 3E5
- Coordinates: 45.005836°N 72.14211°W

Details
- Opened: 1909

Website
- Official US web site; Official Canadian web site
- U.S. Inspection Station-Beebe Plain, Vermont
- U.S. National Register of Historic Places
- MPS: U.S. Border Inspection Stations MPS
- NRHP reference No.: 14000608
- Added to NRHP: September 10, 2014

The Beebe Plain–Beebe Border Crossing is a border crossing station on the Canada–United States border. It connects Rue Principale (Quebec Route 247) in Beebe Plain, Quebec (a former municipality, since 1995 part of the town of Stanstead) with Beebe Road in Beebe Plain, a village in Derby, Vermont. Both the US and Canadian station buildings are historical properties listed by their respective governments.

== Setting ==
The crossing is located in western Stanstead and central Derby, near the heart of the village of Beebe Plain, which is divided by the international border. This crossing area is best known for being bisected by Canusa Street which runs along the border for almost a half-mile, before emerging between the US and Canada border stations. Residents on the south side of Canusa Street live on the American side of the border, while those living across the street on the north side reside in Canada; they are prohibited by law from visiting one another without first reporting to border inspectors. Both Rue Principale and Canusa Street are signed as part of Quebec Route 247.

From 1864 to the early 1900s, this crossing was also the site of the world's only international post office, with one postmaster and two doors, one for American customers and one for Canadian customers. That building, built in the 1820s with local granite, still stands divided at 1–3, rue Principale (Main Street) as a private home directly opposite the customs houses.

== Canadian station ==
The Canadian station is located at the northeast corner of Canusa Street and Rue Principale. It is a Tudor Revival style structure, built in 1932. It was recognized by the Canadian government as a Federal Heritage Building in 1991 for its architecture. Following the 1995 creation of the town of Stanstead by merging the villages of Beebe, Stanstead Plain and Rock Island, Canada renamed this station the Stanstead-Beebe border inspection station.

== United States station ==
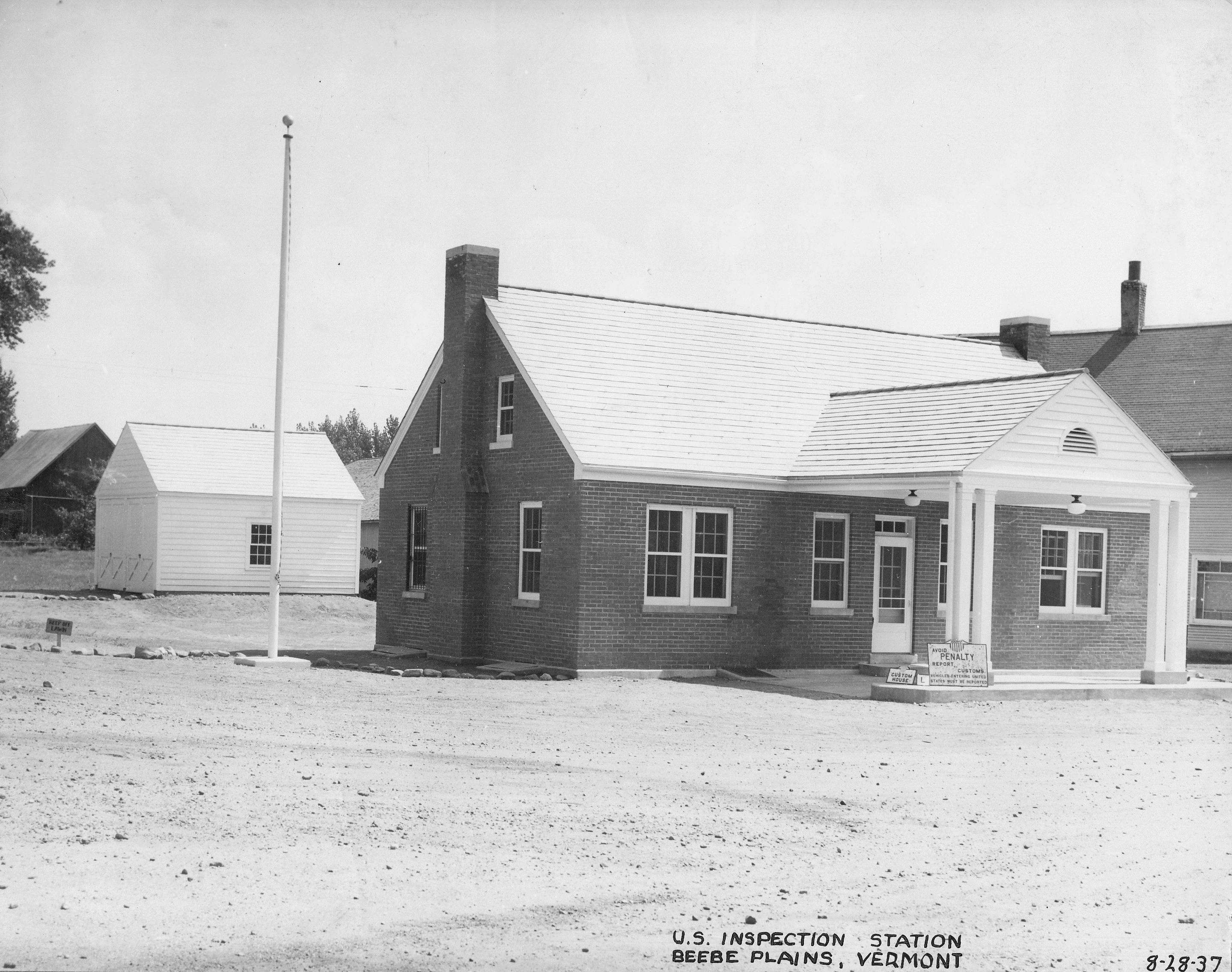
US border station at Beebe Plain as seen in 1937

The US station is located at the southeast corner of Canusa Street and Beebe Road. It is a small single-story brick building, with a side gable roof and end chimneys. It is five bays wide, with the outer bays housing double sash windows and the inner bays housing single sash windows, with the building entrance at the center. A single-lane porte-cochere with a cross-gabled roof extends across a single travel lane. The station was built in 1937, and is one of four surviving buildings of this building type on American borders. The building was listed on the US National Register of Historic Places in 2014.

A hydraulic barrier was added on the American side in 2018, disrupting the lives of American residents of Canusa Street.

== See also ==
- Beebe Plain and Massawippi Valley Railway
- List of Canada–United States border crossings
- National Register of Historic Places listings in Orleans County, Vermont
- List of historic places in Estrie
