= Derby Line–Stanstead Border Crossing =

Border crossing between Canada and the United States

Derby Line-Stanstead Border Crossing
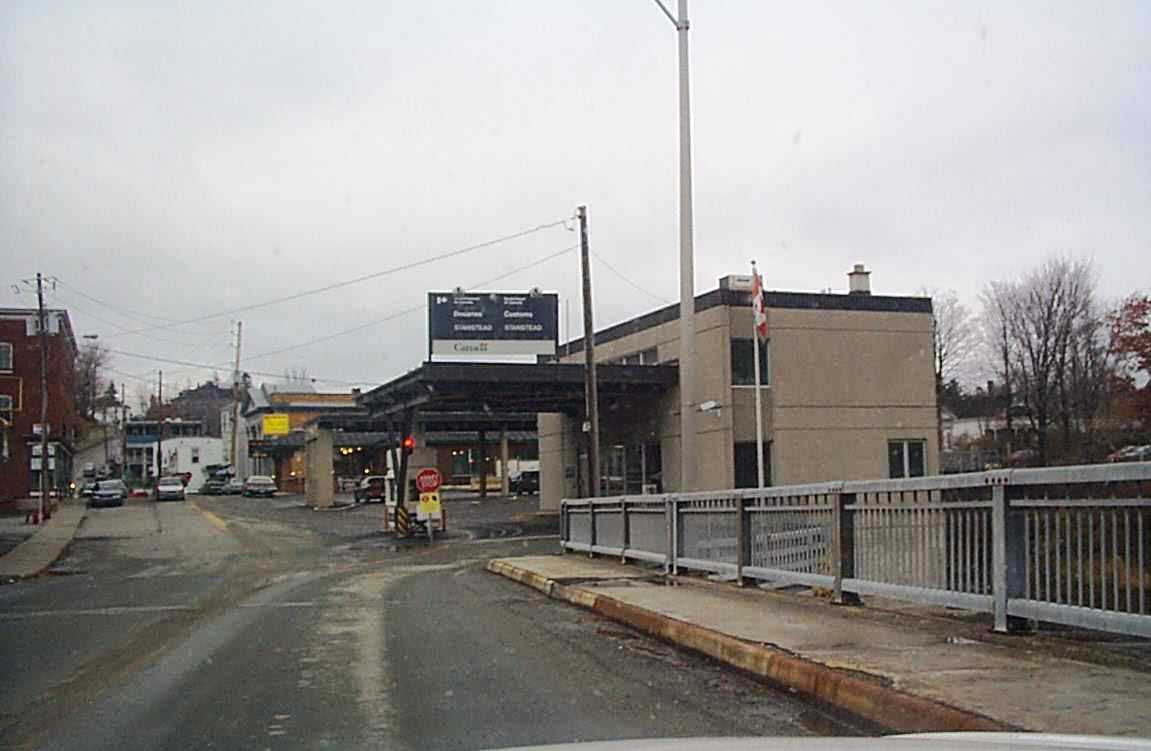
- Canada Border Inspection Station at Stanstead, Quebec

Location
- Country: United States; Canada
- Location: US 5 / R-143; U.S. Port: 84 Main St, Derby Line, Vermont 05830; Canadian Port: 226 Dufferin Street, Stanstead, Quebec J0B 3E2
- Coordinates: 45.00579°N 72.099323°W

Details
- Opened: 1909

Website
- Official Canadian web site; Official US web site
- U.S. Inspection Station-Derby Line, Vermont
- U.S. National Register of Historic Places
- MPS: U.S. Border Inspection Stations MPS
- NRHP reference No.: 14000609
- Added to NRHP: September 10, 2014

The Derby Line–Stanstead Border Crossing is a border crossing station on the Canada–United States border, connecting the towns of Stanstead, Quebec and Derby Line, Vermont. It connects Main Street (U.S. Route 5) in Derby Line with Quebec Route 143 in Stanstead. It is one of two local crossings between the two towns (the other is the Beebe Plain–Beebe Border Crossing), which historically had many more. This was a major crossing point until the construction of Interstate 91 (I-91) and the Derby Line–Rock Island Border Crossing in 1965. The historic 1930s United States station facilities were listed on the National Register of Historic Places in 2014. Both stations are open 24 hours per day.

== Setting ==
This border crossing is located between the villages of Derby Line, Vermont and Stanstead, Quebec, both of which are developed up to the border. The two villages have a historically friendly relationship with one another, and there were several roads east of the U.S. 5-Quebec 143 crossing that once crossed the border, but have been barricaded since 2009. The cross-border relationship was cemented in part by the construction in 1904 of the Haskell Free Library and Opera House, which straddles the border and provides library services to both communities. The border itself is an east–west line, with a portion of the Tomifobia River running east–west just to its north. The bi-national nature of these two villages has always presented border security challenges, and in recent years local residents have been prohibited from moving freely from one side to the other. Prior to the September 11 attacks, anyone could enter the United States using any of the roads, as long as they then proceeded directly to the nearest port of entry to report. Since then however, cross-border travel between the villages on any road other than U.S. Route 5 or I-91 is strictly prohibited.

== United States station ==
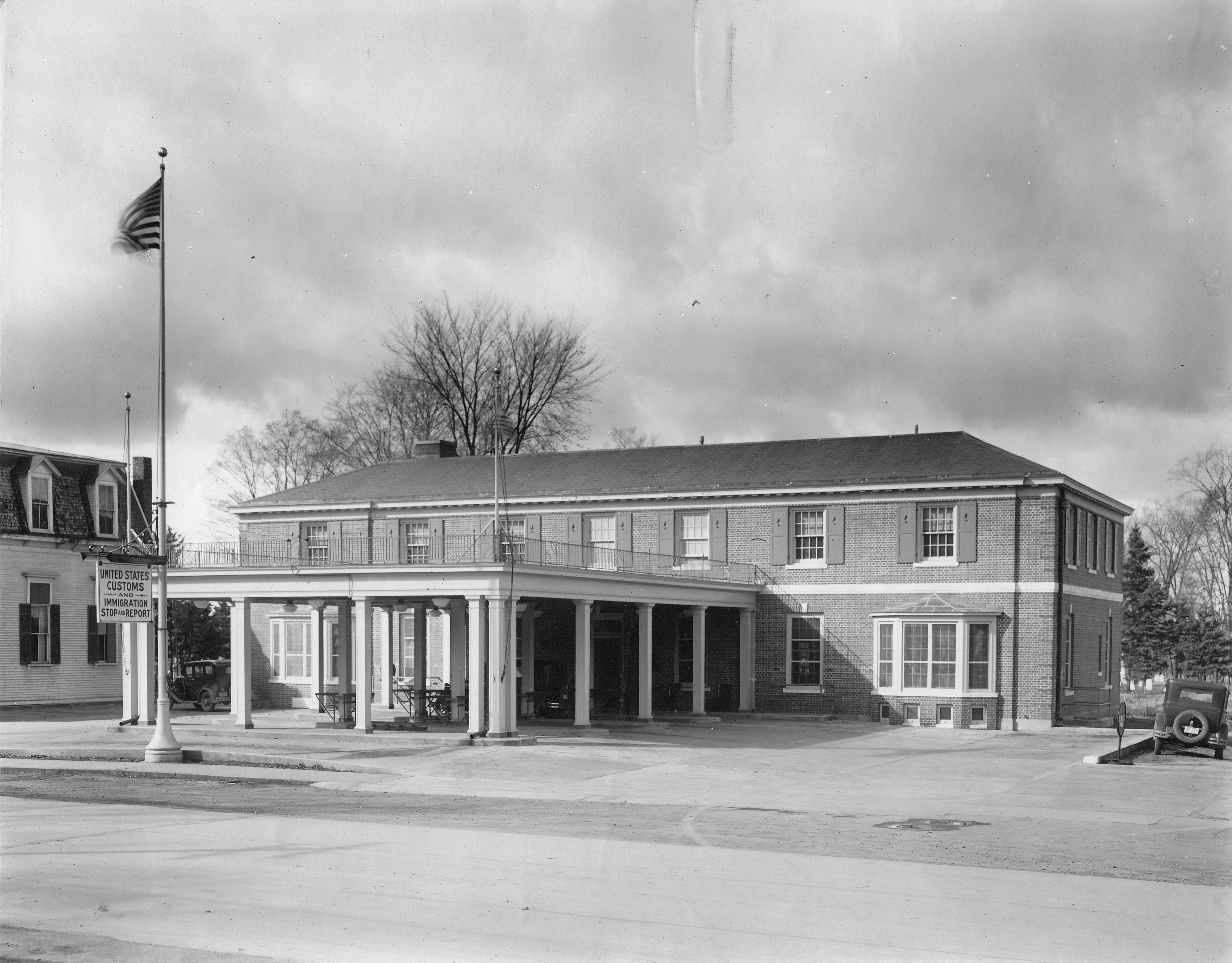
U.S. border station on U.S. Route 5 in Derby Line, VT as seen in 1932

The U.S. border station stands about 300 feet (91 m) south of the border, on the west side of U.S. Route 5. Its main building is a two-story brick Georgian Revival structure with a hip roof. A metal porte-cochere extends across two lanes, diverted from the roadway for the processing of incoming vehicles. Behind the main building stand an eight-bay vehicle inspection garage, and a wood-frame cattle inspection facility. Due to a decrease in the use of the crossing, only the southern part of the main building is used for customs and immigration; the northern portion now houses the local post office.

The station was formally opened in 1932, when the main building was completed. It is one of several standardized inspection station layouts developed by the United States Treasury Department, and was the largest and most architecturally sophisticated of those built in Vermont in the 1930s. It was built as part of a program to improve border security developed to respond to increased use of the automobile, increased illegal border crossing, and smuggling related to Prohibition. The principal alterations to the building have been to the northern half of the ground floor, to accommodate the new use as a post office.

Prior to 1932, U.S. Customs operated out of an office in a hotel that was located adjacent to the current border station. In the 1920s, Customs and Immigration offices were located in a rented home.

== Canadian station ==
The current Canada border station was built in 1970. The former Canada border station still stands adjacent to it, and functions as a restaurant.

The streets of the little town of Stanstead were, in the past, connected to the streets of Derby on the U.S. side. All local streets are now gated in one fashion or another, so traffic must pass through the one port on Main Street. The Canadian name for the port was once Rock Island.

Since 2024, hours of operation for both sides are from 8 a.m. to 8 p.m., seven days a week. There are no commercial services offered at this border crossing. Also, near this station Canada has installed an automated security barrier. Vehicles heading towards the U.S. have to make a brief stop. When a sensor detects the presence of a vehicle, the barrier will automatically open to allow the vehicle to advance to the Derby line (Highway 5) crossing in Vermont.

== See also ==
- List of Canada–United States border crossings
- National Register of Historic Places listings in Orleans County, Vermont
