= List of historic places in Estrie =

This article is a list of historic places in Estrie, Quebec, entered on the Canadian Register of Historic Places, whether they are federal, provincial, or municipal. All addresses are the administrative Region 05. For all other listings in the province of Quebec, see List of historic places in Quebec.

Name	Address	Coordinates	Government recognition (CRHP №)	Wikidata ID	Image
Border Crossing Facility	2, rue Principale, Route 247; Beebe QC	45°00′22″N 72°08′31″W	Federal (11072, (10214)		
St. Laurent Store and Warehouse	Compton QC	45°14′26″N 71°49′35″W	Federal (11457)		More images
St. Laurent House	6 rue Principale; Compton QC	45°14′00″N 71°49′00″W	Federal (10410)		
Pont couvert de la Frontière	Chemin Bellevue; Potton QC	45°05′00″N 72°22′00″W	Quebec (14803)		More images
Grange ronde de Mansonville	Potton QC	45°03′10″N 72°23′34″W	Quebec (16207)		
Site du patrimoine de North Hatley	North Hatley QC	45°16′18″N 71°16′34″W	Quebec (11086)		
Site du patrimoine de La Poudrière	Windsor QC	45°34′45″N 71°59′24″W	Quebec (9410)		
Église de Saint-Joseph-de-Ham-Sud	1, Chemin Gosford Nord; Saint-Joseph-de-Ham-Sud QC	45°45′23″N 71°36′02″W	Quebec (11067)		
Moulin à laine d'Ulverton	210, chemin Porter, Ulverton; Ulverton QC	45°41′26″N 72°16′10″W	Quebec (7030)		More images
Louis S. St. Laurent National Historic Site of Canada	6 Principale Street South, Compton; Compton QC	45°14′29″N 71°49′30″W	Federal (7637)		
Église de Saint-Herménégilde	Rue Principale; Saint-Herménégilde QC	45°06′18″N 71°40′29″W	Quebec (7711)		
Église de Saint-Wilfrid	Barnston-Ouest QC	45°08′36″N 71°58′00″W	Quebec (7715)		
Presbytère de Saint-Louis-de-France	166, rue Saint-Jean Est; East Angus QC	45°29′02″N 71°39′28″W	Quebec (8097)		
Site du patrimoine de l'église de Saint-Venant-de-Paquette	Chemin du Village; Saint-Venant-de-Paquette QC	45°07′31″N 71°27′46″W	Quebec (8295)		
Grange ronde Stanley-Holmes	2523, Chemin Holmes, Barnston-Ouest; Barnston-Ouest QC	45°07′12″N 71°58′27″W	Quebec (9671)		More images
Site du patrimoine du Pont-Couvert-McVetty-McKerry	Route 257; Lingwick QC	45°37′00″N 71°23′40″W	Quebec (11237)		More images
Église Saint-Andrew	Chemin Tuer; Bolton-Ouest QC	45°11′33″N 72°27′05″W	Quebec (15338)		
Bolton-Est Town Hall National Historic Site of Canada	Bolton-Est QC	45°11′00″N 72°17′00″W	Federal (14665)		
Site du patrimoine de l'Église-Anglicane-Saint John-et-du-Cimetière-Mount Pleasant Union	4e Rang; Frontenac QC	45°31′57″N 70°47′22″W	Quebec (12040)		
Maison Laplante	280, 9e Avenue; Weedon QC	45°41′50″N 71°27′24″W	Quebec (8834)		
Église Saint-Matthew	424, Chemin de la Diligence; Stukely-Sud QC	45°19′17″N 72°24′42″W	Quebec (7969)		
Presbytère de Saint-Georges-de-Windsor	493, Rue Principale; Saint-Georges-de-Windsor QC	45°41′54″N 71°50′43″W	Quebec (8217)		
Hôtel de ville	Chemin Curtis; Stanstead-Est QC	45°05′45″N 72°03′22″W	Quebec (7319)		More images
Haskell Free Library and Opera House National Historic Site of Canada	1 Church Street; Stanstead QC	45°00′20″N 72°05′52″W	Federal (7322), Quebec (4240)		More images
Église Advent Christian	Rue Principale; Stanstead QC	45°00′27″N 72°08′36″W	Quebec (15743)		
Loge maçonnique Golden Rule no 5	560, Rue Dufferin; Stanstead QC	45°01′02″N 72°05′33″W	Quebec (15711)		More images
Maison Butters	470, Rue Dufferin; Stanstead QC	45°00′48″N 72°05′40″W	Quebec (15712)		
Maison Carrollcroft	535, Rue Dufferin; Stanstead QC	45°00′59″N 72°05′38″W	Quebec (15713)		
Église Plymouth Trinity	380, Rue Dufferin; Sherbrooke QC	45°24′24″N 71°53′46″W	Quebec (15274)		
Granada Theatre National Historic Site of Canada	53 Wellington Street North; Sherbrooke QC	45°24′08″N 71°53′28″W	Federal (1236)		More images
Gare du CP	780, Rue Minto; Sherbrooke QC	45°23′48″N 71°53′52″W	Federal (4597), Quebec (15230)		
Gare du CN de Sherbrooke	50-80 Depot Street; Sherbrooke QC	45°24′03″N 71°53′19″W	Federal (6709), Sherbrooke municipality (6213)		
Église Sainte-Marguerite-Marie	Rue Saint-Patrice Est; Magog QC	45°15′50″N 71°08′17″W	Quebec (13189)		
Gare du Canadian Pacific (Canadian American Railway)	Railway Street; Lac-Megantic QC	45°34′30″N 70°52′52″W	Federal (4577), Quebec (8710)		
Académie d'Eaton Corner	1864, rue Principale; Cookshire-Eaton QC	45°21′52″N 71°35′51″W	Quebec (6608)		
Bureau de poste	East Angus QC	45°29′06″N 71°39′35″W	Quebec (6685)		
Église Christ Church	East Angus QC	45°29′10″N 71°39′46″W	Quebec (6861)		
Église de Saint-Louis-de-France	166, rue St-Jean Est; East Angus QC	45°29′02″N 71°39′30″W	Quebec (6879)		
Église Emmanuel United Church	East Angus QC	45°28′51″N 71°39′53″W	Quebec (6883)		
Centre de l'interprétation de l'ardoise	5, Rue Belmont; Richmond QC	45°39′26″N 72°08′57″W	Quebec (8985)		
Bureau d'enregistrement de Richmond	295, Rue Principale Sud; Richmond QC	45°39′16″N 72°08′25″W	Quebec (9560)		
Église d'Eaton Corner	Rue de Cookshire; Cookshire-Eaton QC	45°21′52″N 71°35′53″W	Quebec (10167)		
École Milby	2120, Chemin McVety; Waterville QC	45°18′47″N 71°49′33″W	Quebec (11154)		
Maison Houston	4, Rue Daniel-Johnson; Danville QC	45°47′04″N 72°00′53″W	Quebec (8416)		
Moulin Denison	504, Chemin Denison; Danville QC	45°44′52″N 72°06′09″W	Quebec (8862)		
Grange circulaire Damase-Amédée-Dufresne	101 a 105, chemin Fisher; Austin QC	45°09′30″N 72°16′13″W	Quebec (4238)		
Presbytère de Saint-Joseph-d'Ely	800, Rue Saint-Joseph; Valcourt QC	45°29′50″N 72°18′57″W	Quebec (8096)		
Bijouterie Drainville	980, Rue Saint-Joseph; Valcourt QC	45°29′41″N 72°18′54″W	Quebec (8131)		
Église de Saint-Joseph-d'Ely	Rue Saint-Joseph; Valcourt QC	45°29′49″N 72°18′55″W	Quebec (8335)		
Maison Joseph-Armand-Bombardier	794, Rue Saint-Joseph; Valcourt QC	45°29′52″N 72°18′57″W	Quebec (10641)		
Église de Saint-Samuel	Rue Principale; Lac-Drolet QC	45°43′05″N 70°50′54″W	Lac-Drolet municipality (8418)		
Presbytère de Saint-Samuel	677, Rue Principale; Lac-Drolet QC	45°43′04″N 70°50′57″W	Lac-Drolet municipality (8419)		
Maison René-Robert	705, Rue Principale; Lac-Drolet QC	45°43′09″N 70°51′00″W	Lac-Drolet municipality (8833)		
Cimetière Gisla	Chemin Gisla; Milan QC	45°38′01″N 71°08′43″W	Milan municipality (9408)		
Parc Morrison	Chemin Dell; Milan QC	45°36′06″N 71°08′29″W	Milan municipality (9409)		
Résidence Bernardin-Therrien	357, 7e Rang; Lac-Drolet QC	45°45′34″N 70°52′44″W	Lac-Drolet municipality (11985)		
Vieux couvent	698, Rue Principale; Lac-Drolet QC	45°43′15″N 70°50′59″W	Lac-Drolet municipality (11986)		
Moulin Legendre	Route 161 Nord; Stornoway QC	45°43′04″N 71°10′16″W	Stornoway municipality (12382)		
Église baptiste de Barnston	1169, Chemin de Baldwin Mills-Barnston; Coaticook QC	45°06′20″N 71°53′04″W	Quebec (7312)		
Église Sisco Memorial	116, Rue Wellington; Coaticook QC	45°08′09″N 71°48′29″W	Quebec (7315)		
Grange de la Ferme-du-Plateau-de-Coaticook	129, Rue Morgan; Coaticook QC	45°08′20″N 71°49′09″W	Quebec (7968)		
Vieille gare de Coaticook	131, Rue Lovell; Coaticook QC	45°08′04″N 71°48′58″W	Quebec (8246)		
Vieille poste	34 Rue Main Est; Coaticook QC	45°07′57″N 71°48′17″W	Coaticook municipality (7318)		
Château Arthur-Osmore-Norton	96, Rue de l'Union; Coaticook QC	45°07′50″N 71°48′28″W	Quebec (9060)		More images
Hôtel de ville de Sherbrooke	191, rue du Palais; Sherbrooke QC	45°24′15″N 71°53′34″W	Quebec (4246)		More images
Chapelle Saint-Mark	Bishop's College (Campus); Sherbrooke QC	45°21′58″N 71°50′57″W	Quebec (10398)		More images
Pont de Milby	Chemin du Pont-Couvert; Waterville QC	45°18′55″N 71°49′25″W	Quebec (10405)		More images
Canadian Pacific Railway Station	221 St. Jean Street west East Angus QC	45°29′05″N 71°39′39″W	Federal (6633), East Angus municipality (8481)		
Église Saint-James	100 Rue Main; Hatley QC	45°11′06″N 71°56′12″W	Quebec (13002)		
Église de Sainte-Agnès	Rue Laval; Lac-Mégantic QC	45°34′43″N 70°53′11″W	Lac-Mégantic municipality (13254)		
Site de l'église de Saint-Vital	Rue Principale; Lambton QC	45°50′18″N 71°05′27″W	Lambton municipality (8604)		
Canadian National Railway Station	Rue Principale; Richmond QC	45°39′55″N 72°08′53″W	Federal (6719)		
Église Christ Church	Rue Dufferin; Stanstead QC	45°01′02″N 72°05′34″W	Stanstead municipality (15710)		
Armoury	Rue des Fusilliers at Rue Belvedere Sud; Sherbrooke QC	45°23′51″N 71°53′46″W	Federal (9767)		
Federal Building	50 Place de la Cite; Sherbrooke QC	45°23′59″N 71°53′40″W	Federal (9492)		
