= Massawippi Valley Railway =

Defunct Quebec railway

Overview
- Headquarters: Sherbrooke (as QCRR)
- Locale: Lennoxville-Newport
- Dates of operation: 1870–1923
- Successor: Québec Central (CPR) last passenger 1960 abandoned 1990 tracks removed 1992

Technical
- Track gauge: 4 ft 8 1/2 in (1,435 mm) standard gauge
- Length: 51 kilometres (32 mi)

The Massawippi Valley Railway was a short line railway established in 1870 between Lennoxville, Quebec, and the Vermont border. Part of the Quebec Central Railway from 1926, the line was abandoned in 1990 and removed in 1992. Most of the former railway's right of way is now used for bicycle trails.

== History ==
The Connecticut River Division of the Connecticut and Passumpsic Rivers Railroad had completed its line from White River Junction, Vermont to Newport in October, 1863 and to the Canada–US border in May, 1867. The Canadian Pacific Railway already served Sherbrooke and Lennoxville, Quebec; the St. Lawrence and Atlantic Railroad (later part of the Grand Trunk Railway) linked Montréal via Sherbrooke to Portland, Maine.

This left a gap where passengers and freight would be transferred to stagecoaches upon arriving in the Eastern Townships from Vermont.

The border gap was bridged in 1870 by the Massawippi Valley Railway Company, a short line railway extending 31 miles (50 km) from Beebe Junction (on the US border) to Lennoxville (on the CPR line).

A branch 2.4 miles (3.9 km) long brought a rail link from Beebe Junction into Stanstead, Quebec. Service was initially provided using steam locomotives.

Distance (from Sherbrooke)
0 miles (0 km)	Sherbrooke (CPR)
2.9 miles (4.7 km)	Lennoxville
3.3 miles (5.3 km)	Adams
12.4 miles (20.0 km)	North Hatley
21.3 miles (34.3 km)	Ayers Cliff
33.9 miles (54.6 km)	Beebe Junction
40.2 miles (64.7 km)	Newport (Vermont)

A leasehold on this Massawippi line extended the reach of the Connecticut and Passumpsic Rivers Railroad line 110 miles (180 km) (White River Junction - Newport) northward to the Canadian Pacific Railway at Sherbrooke. Onward connections could then be made to Montréal or Québec City in the north and to Boston and New York in the south.

The rail line encouraged growth of the individual villages which it served, bringing new summer visitors to rural communities such as North Hatley, Quebec while facilitating the export of Canadian wood, produce and natural resources.

In 1884, Massawippi Valley Railway's management included John Gilman Foster (1859-1931) as president, Stephen Foster as vice-president and William S. Foster as treasurer. All three simultaneously held positions of authority at the National Bank of Derby Line.

On April 8, 1895, a southbound Boston & Maine Railroad passenger train derailed upon striking a boulder on the track; the engineer and fireman, injured by burns from steam, were transported to Newport but did not survive.

By 1909, Beebe Junction had become the main point of entry to the North Derby, Vermont / Stanstead, Quebec region for customs purposes, a rôle it would only relinquish in the late 1920s as U.S. Route 5 led to increased road traffic at the expense of the railways.

Massawippi Valley Railway was operated by the Connecticut & Passumpsic Rivers Railroad from 1870 to 1919, then leased by the Boston & Maine Railroad from 1919 to 1926.

CPR had leased the Quebec Central Railway in 1912; that railway in turn leased both the line north from Newport and the connecting Massawippi Valley Railway in June 1926.

Throughout the 1930s passenger service ran from Quebec City to Newport, allowing travellers to make onward connections.

== Decline and demise ==
The number of Quebec City - Sherbrooke passenger runs which continued to Newport was progressively curtailed during the 1940s and 1950s, ending entirely by 1960. The Quebec Central Railway was out of the passenger business by 1967 and abandoned the Massawippi line in 1990, ceasing all operations by 1994. The rails through Beebe Junction were removed in 1992.

While the rail line from Newport southward remains in operation as the Washington County Railroad, the only onward Canadian rail connection at Newport is westward through Richford, Vermont via a branch of the Canadian Pacific Railway which joins that company's mainline between Cowansville and Farnham, Quebec. There is no longer a direct, straight-line rail connection from Newport to Sherbrooke.

Much of the former right-of-way is now a Shared-use path:

- Lennoxville maintains a section southward to North Hatley, Quebec as a municipal cycle trail.
- Since 1993, 19 kilometres (12 mi) from Quebec Route 141 in Ayers Cliff to rue Principale (route 247) in Beebe has been cyclable as the Tomifobia nature trail.
- The international portion between rue Principale and North Derby Road within the divided village of Beebe Plain is permanently closed.
- The 6.2 miles (10.0 km) of US rail from Beebe Plain, Vermont to Waterfront Park on Main Street, Newport is now the Newport Bike Path.
- The spur from Stanstead to Beebe Junction is now a Stanstead municipal cycle path.

The 1870 Massawippi Valley Railway station on the main street of Beebe Plain, Quebec still stands but is now a private residence. Likewise, North Hatley's former railway station is now a private residence, having previously been the town hall for the village of North Hatley and Hatley Township, as well as housing a coin laundry. The station at Ayer's Cliff was demolished ca 1970.

== See also ==
- Tomifobia Nature Trail
