= Beebe Plain, Vermont =

US portion of the internationally-divided, unincorporated village of Beebe Plain

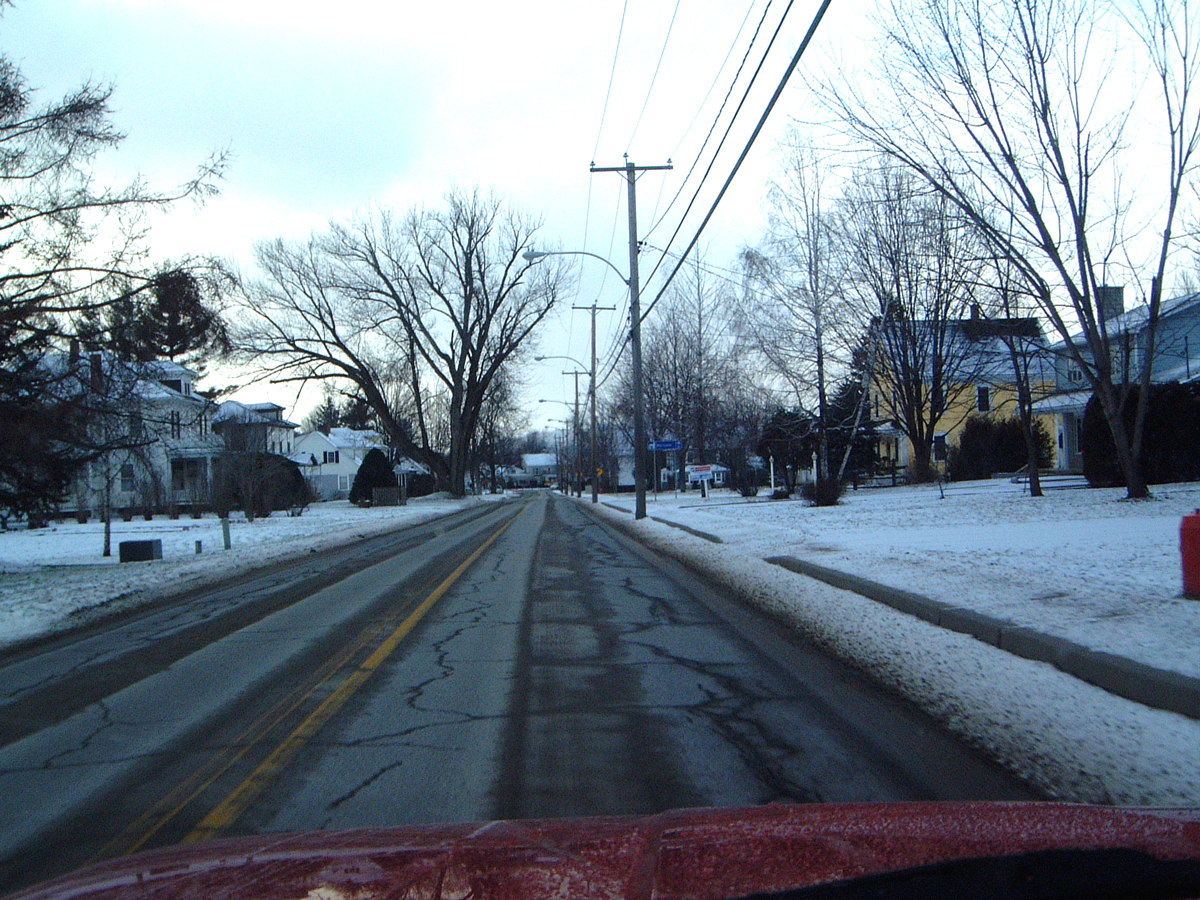
Heading west on Canusa Street. The border is determined by the yellow road line, making houses on the left fall under American jurisdiction, while the right side is governed by Canada. Both sides are part of Beebe Plain, however.

Beebe Plain is an unincorporated community in the town of Derby in Orleans County, Vermont, United States, which extends into the municipality of Stanstead, Quebec, Canada. The village is divided by the Canada–United States border between Canada and the United States; the Canadian portion of Beebe Plain had the status of an incorporated municipality in its own right until 1995.

== Geography ==
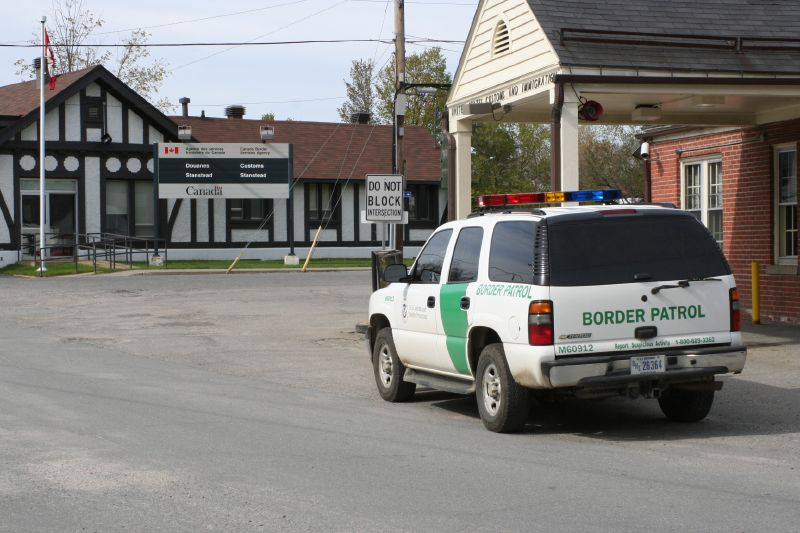
US Border Patrol vehicle at the US-Canada border

The international border runs up the middle of Canusa Street (Quebec Route 247). Local legend claims that a group of rather drunken surveyors, when given the task of determining the United States-Canada border line in the region (nominally at 45.00°N), decided to place the border right through the center of the village along what is now Canusa Street.

Beebe Plain is part of a group of nearby border villages which includes Derby Line, Vermont, and Stanstead, Quebec. Beebe Plain is located near Lake Memphremagog between Newport and Magog.

== Industry ==
Beebe granite or "Stanstead Grey Granite" is famous for its use in architectural design. The production of granite from the region may well be the largest industry, with much of the stone being used in the construction of tombstones and memorials.

== History ==
The village was founded circa 1798 by Thomas B. Beebe, born 1776 in Windsor, Vermont.

== Features ==
The former Massawippi Valley Railway line once joined Lennoxville, Quebec, through a border crossing at Beebe Plain to Newport, Vermont. That line was abandoned and removed by the Canadian Pacific Railway between 1989 and 1991. Portions of the former right-of-way remain open for recreational use:

- Beebe Plain, Vermont, to Waterfront Park (Main Street, US 5) Newport as the Newport Bike Path.
- Beebe Plain, Québec, to Ayer's Cliff, a 19 kilometres (12 mi) bicycle and pedestrian trail, le sentier nature Tomifobia.
- Beebe Junction, Québec, to Stanstead village (a former spur), as the Piste Cyclable de Stanstead
- a segment from North Hatley to Lennoxville, Quebec

The section between Beebe's rue Principale (Québec Route 247) and North Derby Road (US) is no longer open, forcing cyclists onto Beebe's main street. A section between Ayer's Cliff and North Hatley is also no longer open.
