= Stanstead Journal =

Canadian newspaper

- Type: Weekly newspaper
- Founded: 1845
- Language: English
- Headquarters: Stanstead, Quebec

Stanstead Journal was an English Weekly newspaper founded in 1845 by LeRoy Robinson in Stanstead, Quebec. It was the oldest weekly newspaper in Quebec. It ceased publication May 29, 2019.

== See also ==
- List of newspapers in Canada
