= Canusa Street =

Street in Stanstead, Canada and Beebe Plain, Vermont, US

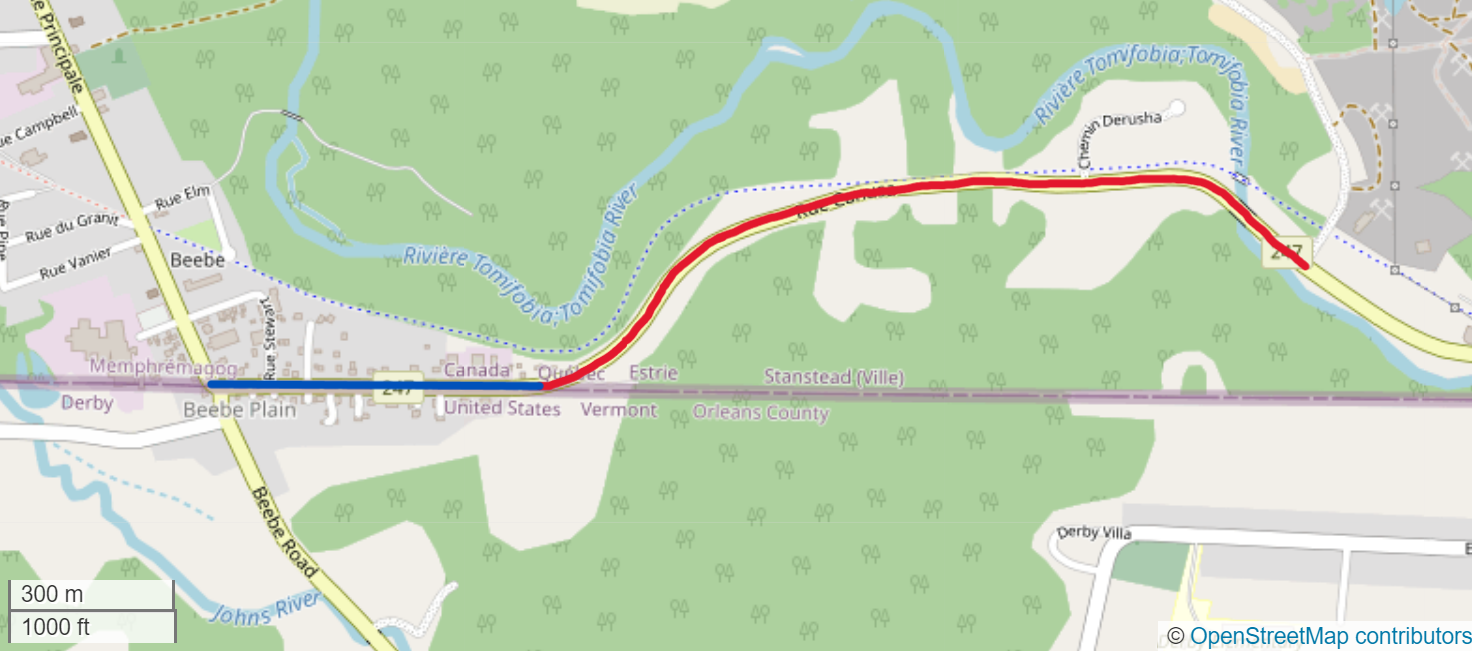
- Path of Canusa Street. Border section marked in blue.
- Interactive map of Canusa Street
- Length: 1.32 mi (2.12 km)
- Location: Beebe Plain, Vermont (United States); Stanstead, Quebec (Canada)
- West end: R-247 / Rue Principale (Canada); Beebe Plain Road (US)
- East end: R-247 / Rue Railroad

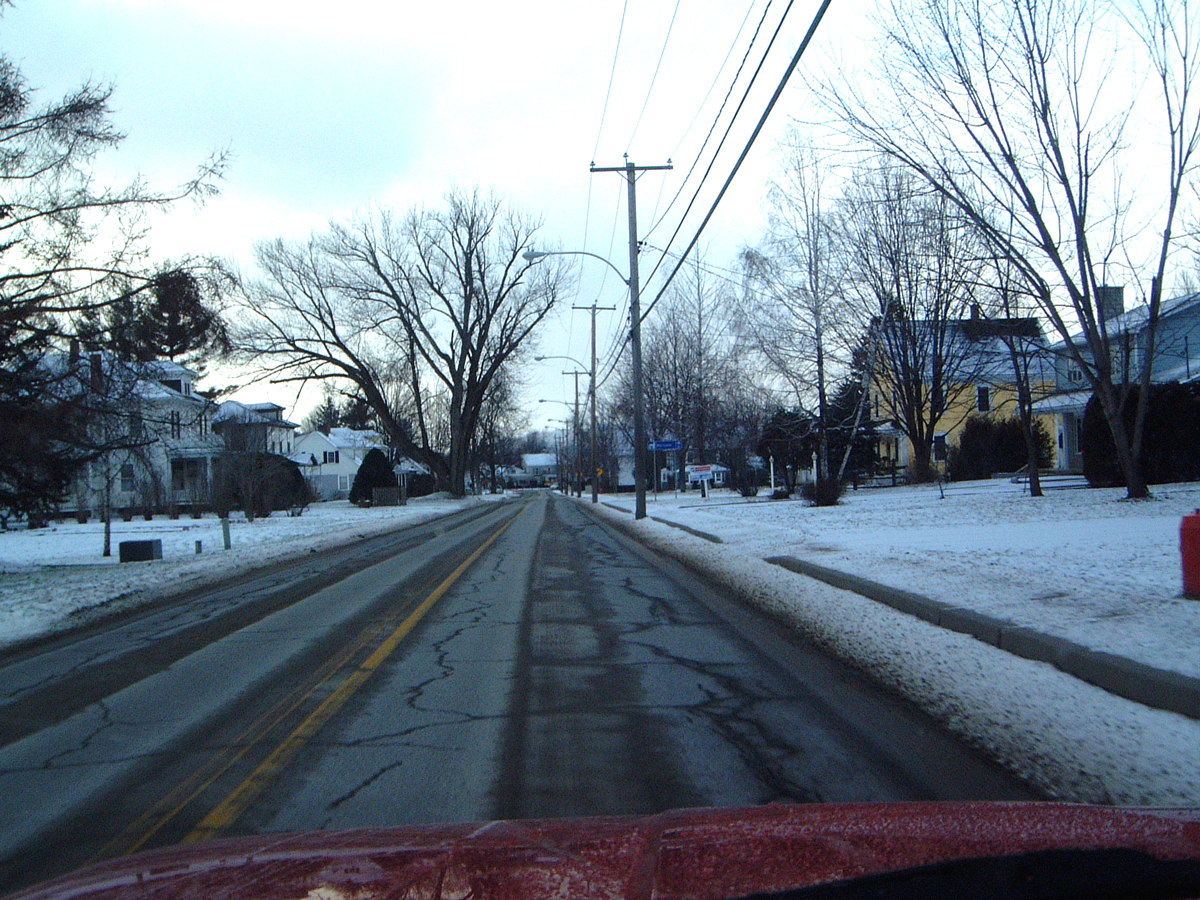
Canusa Street, known as rue Canusa in French, runs through the middle of Beebe Plain, forming the northern border for Vermont, and dividing the Vermont and Québec sides of the village. In this photograph, the houses on the left are in the United States and those on the right are in Canada.

Canusa Street (French: rue Canusa) is a road part of Quebec Route 247.

The road primarily runs east–west, connecting Rue Principale to the west and Rue Railroad to the east. A particular 0.38 mi (0.61 km) long stretch of Canusa Street runs along the 45th parallel north, which defines the Canada–United States border. On this stretch of road, the middle yellow line defines the international border and separates Beebe Plain, Vermont, in the United States, from the Beebe Plain area of Stanstead, Quebec, in Canada. This characteristic contributes to the road's name and unique living dynamics for its residents.

== Origin of name ==
The name "Canusa" derives from the amalgamation of "Can" (abbreviation of Canada) and "USA" (initialism of the United States of America).

== History and description ==
Local legend claims that a group of rather drunken surveyors, when given the task of determining the United States–Canada border line in the region (nominally at 45.00°N), decided to place the border right through the middle of the village along what is now Canusa Street. On the current cadastral graphic matrix, however, the border line is drawn along the southern border to the street, suggesting that it is entirely located within Canada. In practice, the road itself is treated as the border, dividing Canadian residents to the north from United States residents to the south.

At the west end of Canusa Street is a three-way intersection that is home to the Beebe Plain–Beebe Border Crossing. Immediately facing the customs houses, located at the end of the street, is a solid granite line house. This building (built as a store in the 1820s) was for a time the world's only international post office. It had one postmaster, but two doors and two postal counters, each serving customers from a different country. Although it is located on the border, users still must go through typical border crossing procedures when coming from the Canadian side.

== Significance ==
The yellow line running down the middle of the road in the section along the 45th parallel is treated as the international border, separating United States on the south from Canada on the north. This unique geographic location means that houses and residents on the south side of the road are in the United States, while those on the north side are in Canada. Citizens of Stanstead take pride in its unique location, and participate in an annual gathering, celebrating the "friendliest border in the world". The celebrations include processions of vehicles and parades that run through the town of Stanstead.

Around 1 mi (1.6 km) east of the eastern end of the road lies the Haskell Free Library and Opera House. This building, deliberately built on the Canada-USA border, has addresses in both countries: 93 Caswell Avenue, Derby Line, Vermont, and 1 rue Church (Church Street), Stanstead, Quebec. The main entrance is on the US side of the border, and is also the only side where visitors can enter and exit. Visitors coming from the Canadian side are allowed to cross the border on foot via the sidewalk from Church Street in order to enter, but must return to Canada the same way upon exiting the library. Although the structure is not located on Canusa Street, it is often associated with it, given its similar nature. The library, like the road, serves a significant cultural purpose, and is recognized by both Canada and United States as a historical site.

== Border control ==
Throughout the 21st century, the Canada – United States Border has seen increasingly strict levels of control, with events such as the September 11 attacks, immigration policies under Donald Trump, and the COVID-19 pandemic greatly influencing border policies. In addition, immigration policies that put focus on the strengthening of the United States' southern border invertedly draws criminal activity to United States' northern border with Canada, which makes historically less-patrolled areas such as Canusa Street and the Haskell Free Library and Opera House incentivizing locations for illegal activity, including illegal crossings and smugglings. In the wake of these events and the overall strengthening of borders, crossing the border has become increasingly difficult with frequent patrol. A once-simple action of crossing between sides of the road on foot is no longer allowed and strictly enforced, and it is necessary to report any crossing of the border to the customs office. The Derby Line Border Crossing, located east of Canusa Street, saw a significant decrease in pedestrian traffic throughout the 21st century, with 273 pedestrian crossings into the United States in 2010 compared to 16,474 in 2000 — a 98.3% decrease in 10 years. Pedestrian traffic continued to decrease throughout the next decade, reaching a low of only two entries into the United States in 2021 due to Canadian COVID-19 border restrictions. Strict border crossing policies and complicated procedures complicate the lives of residents around the area, especially the 14 houses that are situated directly on the border section of Canusa Street. Multiple barriers and high levels of border control are continuously present along the road. Movement of residents is greatly restricted, as informally crossing the road is illegal and will result in an arrest.
