= Stanstead, Quebec (township) =

Stanstead
- Township municipality
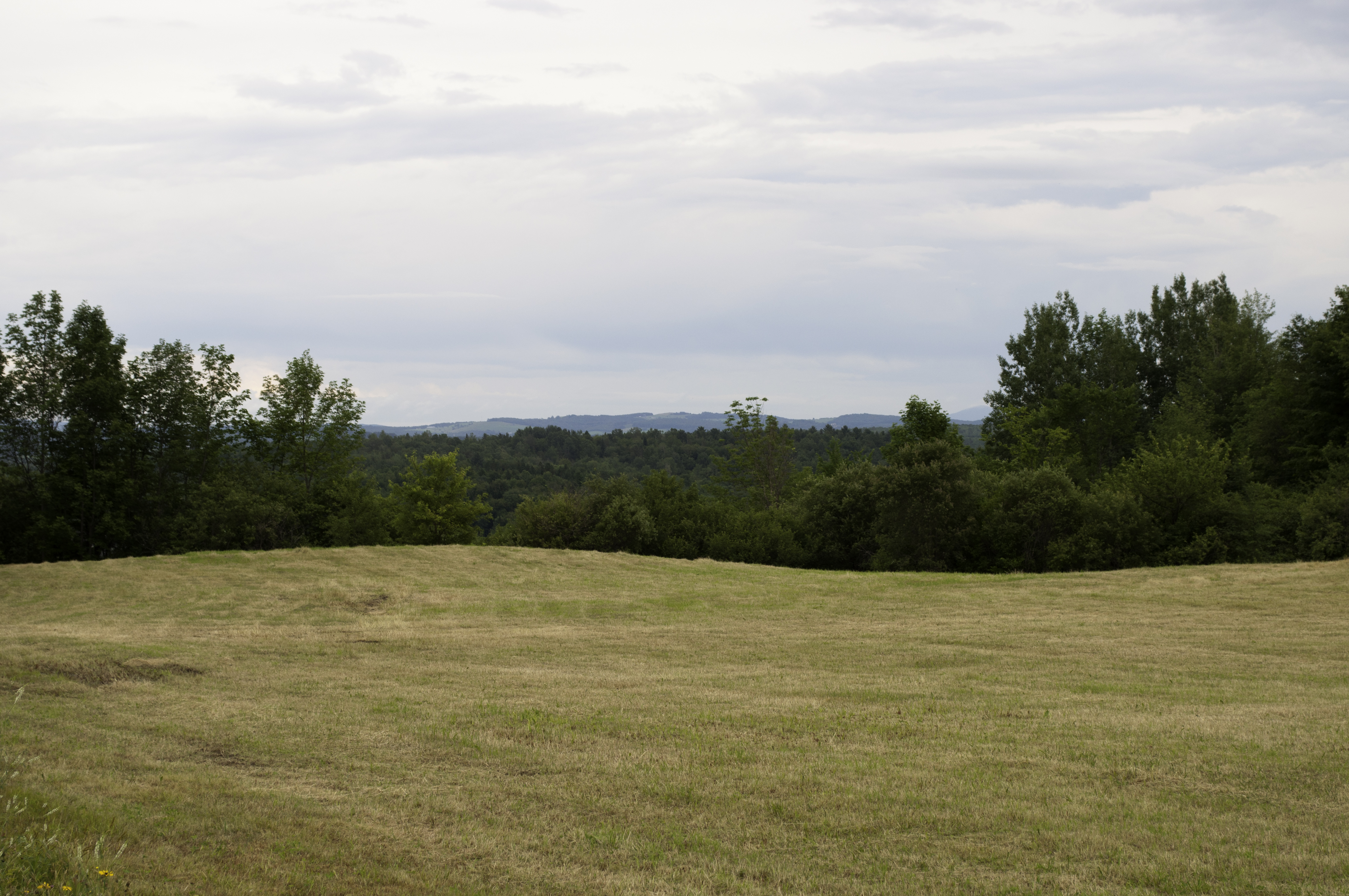
- Amy Corners Area

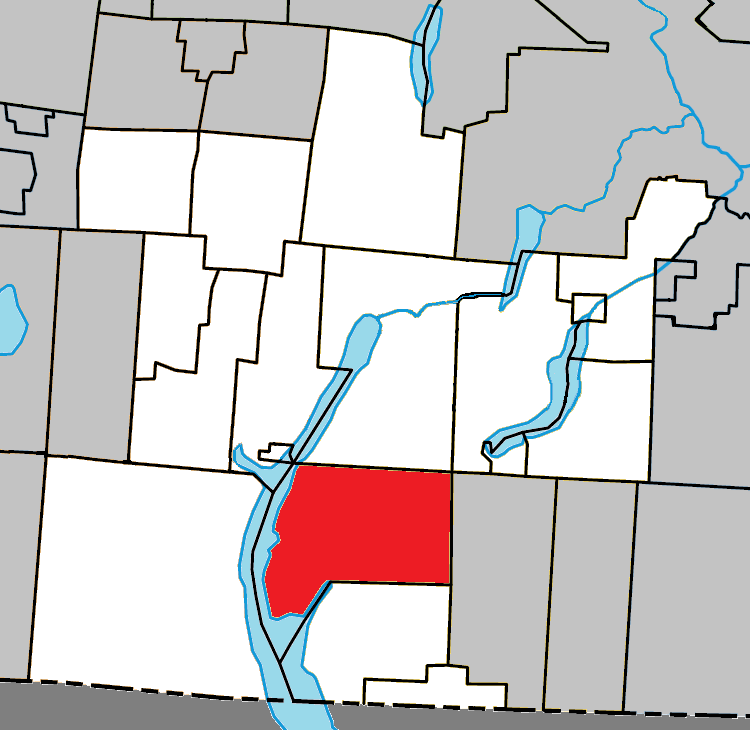
- Location within Memphrémagog RCM

- Location in southern Quebec
- Coordinates: 45°05′N 72°08′W
- Country: Canada
- Province: Quebec
- Region: Estrie
- RCM: Memphrémagog
- Constituted: July 1, 1855

Government
  - Mayor: Eric Evans
  - Federal riding: Compton—Stanstead
  - Prov. riding: Orford

Area
  - Total: 135.70 km^{2} (52.39 sq mi)
  - Land: 113.20 km^{2} (43.71 sq mi)

Population (2021)
  - Total: 1,148
  - Density: 10.1/km^{2} (26/sq mi)
  - Pop 2016-2021: ▲10.8%
  - Dwellings: 957
- Time zone: UTC−5 (EST)
  - Summer (DST): UTC−4 (EDT)
- Postal code(s): J1X 3W4
- Area code: 819
- Highways: R-247
- Website: cantonstanstead.ca

Stanstead is a township municipality of about 1,100 people in the Memphrémagog Regional County Municipality in the Estrie region of Quebec. It is not to be confused with the city of Stanstead, which is nearby although not directly adjacent (the municipality of Ogden lies in between).

Formally, the township consists of two villages: Fitch Bay (founded in 1855) and Georgeville (founded in the 1890s). Today, the population is bilingual with predominance in French language (about 64%).

== Demographics ==
In the 2021 Census of Population conducted by Statistics Canada, Stanstead had a population of 1,148 living in 553 of its 957 total private dwellings, a change of 10.8% from its 2016 population of 1,036. With a land area of 113.2 km^{2} (43.7 sq mi), it had a population density of 10.1/km^{2} (26.3/sq mi) in 2021.

== See also ==
- List of anglophone communities in Quebec
- List of township municipalities in Quebec
