= Quebec Central Railway =

Defunct Canadian railway

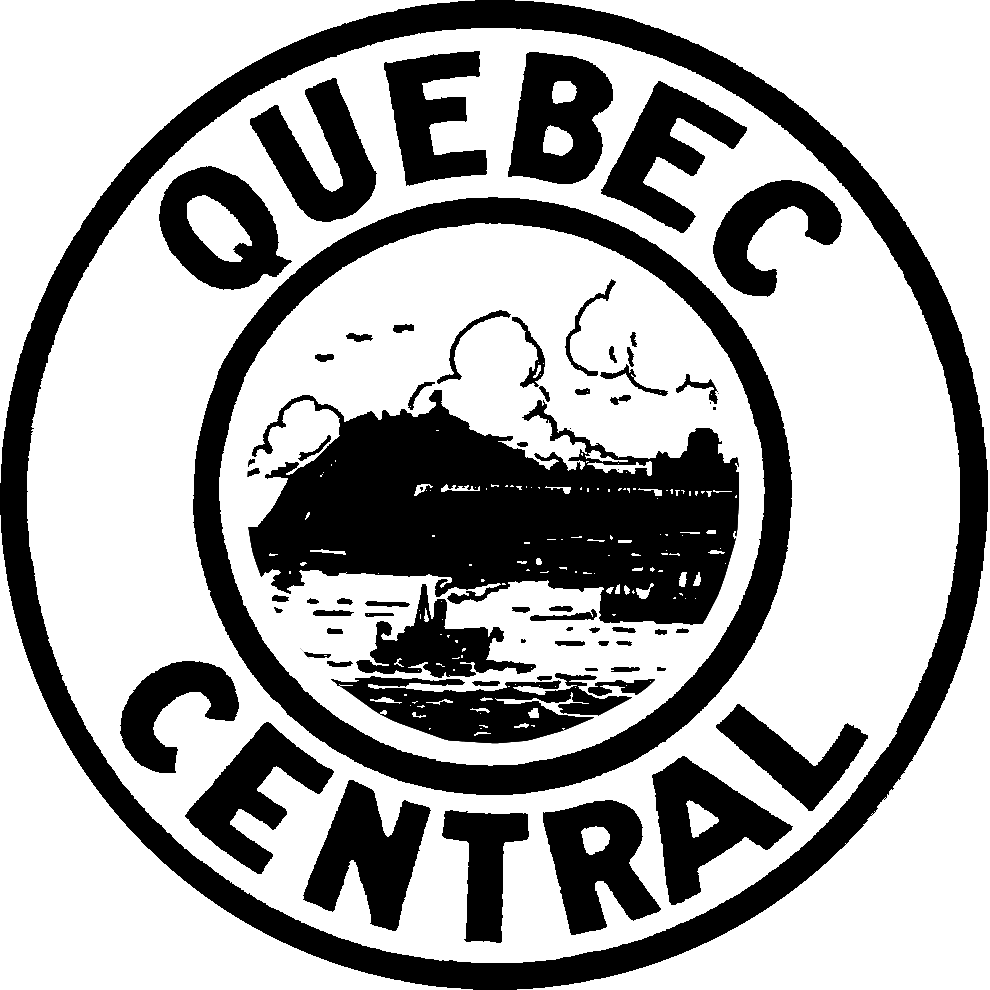

Overview
- Headquarters: Sherbrooke
- Reporting mark: QCR
- Locale: Quebec and Vermont
- Dates of operation: 1869–1994, 2000–2006

The Quebec Central Railway (reporting mark QCR) was a railway in the Canadian province of Quebec, that served the Eastern Townships region south of the St. Lawrence River. Its headquarters was in Sherbrooke. It was originally incorporated in 1869 as the Sherbrooke, Eastern Townships and Kennebec Railway, and changed its name to the Quebec Central Railway in 1875. In 1894, it built a line southward to Mégantic to connect to Canadian Pacific Railway's east-west line, the International Railway of Maine. It would eventually own around 580 km of track. In 1912, the Canadian Pacific Railway leased the Quebec Central for 99 years but continued to operate as Quebec Central Railway, including passenger service to American cities. The Quebec Central in turn leased the Massawippi Valley Railway, a short line from Lennoxville to Newport, in 1926; this allowed passenger service from Quebec City via Sherbrooke to the United States.

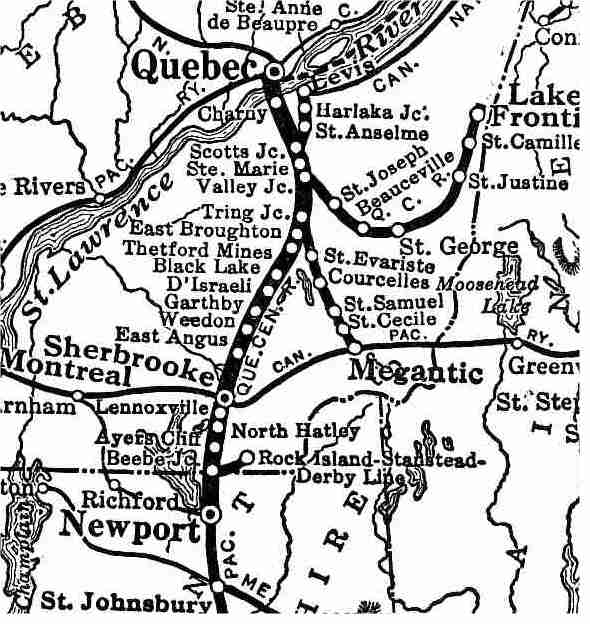
A map of the railroad from 1942

The company operated passenger trains on several long and short routes. Its longest route travelled from Quebec City to Sherbrooke, to then to Newport, Vermont. There, passengers could transfer to Boston and Maine trains, Alouette or Red Wing bound for Boston, Massachusetts. Branch sections from the latter served passengers bound for Portland, Maine. The Boston & Maine and the New York, New Haven and Hartford Railroad operated the Connecticut Yankee from New York City's Grand Central Terminal, up Connecticut River Valley, to Newport and along Quebec Central territory to Sherbrooke and Montreal.

Passenger service ended in April 1967, and freight service ended in November 1994. The Massawippi line's track was entirely removed in 1992. The Quebec Central was abandoned on December 23, 1994. However, because the CPR only owned 10% of the Quebec Central's stock, it could not tear up the track and dispose of the right-of-way. In December 1999, a local resident who owned a trucking company (Express Marco Incorporated) bought the railway from the CPR and revived it, with trains running starting in June 2000. The railway operated tourist excursions in addition to regular freight service. However, the company went out of business in 2006 once more ending railway traffic on the line. The remaining portions of the line currently belong to the Ministère des Transports du Québec.

== Locomotive roster ==
Number	Builder	Model	Serial	Build Date	Locomotive condition	Remarks
JMG1	GE	U23B High Nose	40087	1975-05	Acquired by local preservation group le Groupe TRAQ in 2015	Ex-NS 3944, Nee SOU U23B 3944
SG2	EMD	GP11	16684	1952-06	Scrapped at CN Joffre Yard in 2015	Ex-IC 8722, Nee ICG 8722
GG3	EMD	GP11	22123	1956-08	Scrapped at CN Joffre Yard in 2015	Ex-IC 8732, Ex-MBTA GP9 7543, Nee NH 1213
DG4	GE	U23B	36811	1968-09	Scrapped at East Broughton in 2016	Ex-MEC 288, Ex-D&H 2309, Nee D&H 309
RG5	EMD	GP7u	12365	1950-10	Scrapped at CN Joffre Yard in 2015	Ex-GRS 470, Ex-B&M 470, Ex-MEC 470, Nee MEC 564
GS9	ALCO	S2	74465	1946-05	Scrapped at East Broughton in 2016	Ex-Newburg & South Shore 13A
1300	GMD	FP7A	A371	1952-10	In poor condition in East Broughton in 2024	Ex-AMT 1300, exx-MUCTC 1300, nee-CP 4070/1426, was used in the 1976 movie Silver Streak
1302	GMD	FP7A	A373	1952-10	Scrapped at East Broughton in 2016	Ex-AMT 1302, exx-MUCTC 1302, nee-CP 4072/1428, was used in the 1976 movie Silver Streak
1305	GMD	FP7A	A376	1952-10	Scrapped at Vallée-Jonction in 2009	Ex-AMT 1305, exx-MUCTC 1305, nee-CP 4075/1431

== Bibliography ==
- Booth, John Derek (2006). Quebec Central Railway: From the St. Francis to the Chaudière. Vol. III. Pickering, Ontario: Railfare DC Books. ISBN 9781897190029. Archived from the original on 2020-07-02.
