= Beebe Plain, Quebec =

Coordinates: 45.011484°N 72.145563°W

Beebe Plain is a former municipality and an unincorporated community in Stanstead, Quebec, Canada. It is recognized as a designated place by Statistics Canada.

== History ==
The Village Municipality of Beebe Plain was officially created on January 1, 1883, by separating from the township of Stanstead. On February 15, 1995, Beebe Plain merged with Rock Island and Stanstead Plain to create the new city of Stanstead.

== Demographics ==
In the 2021 Census of Population conducted by Statistics Canada, Beebe Plain had a population of 867 living in 399 of its 438 total private dwellings, a change of 1.5% from its 2016 population of 854. With a land area of 7.87 km^{2} (3.04 sq mi), it had a population density of 110.2/km^{2} (285.3/sq mi) in 2021.

== See also ==
- List of communities in Quebec
- List of designated places in Quebec
- List of former municipalities in Quebec
