= Ogden, Quebec =

Ogden
- Municipality
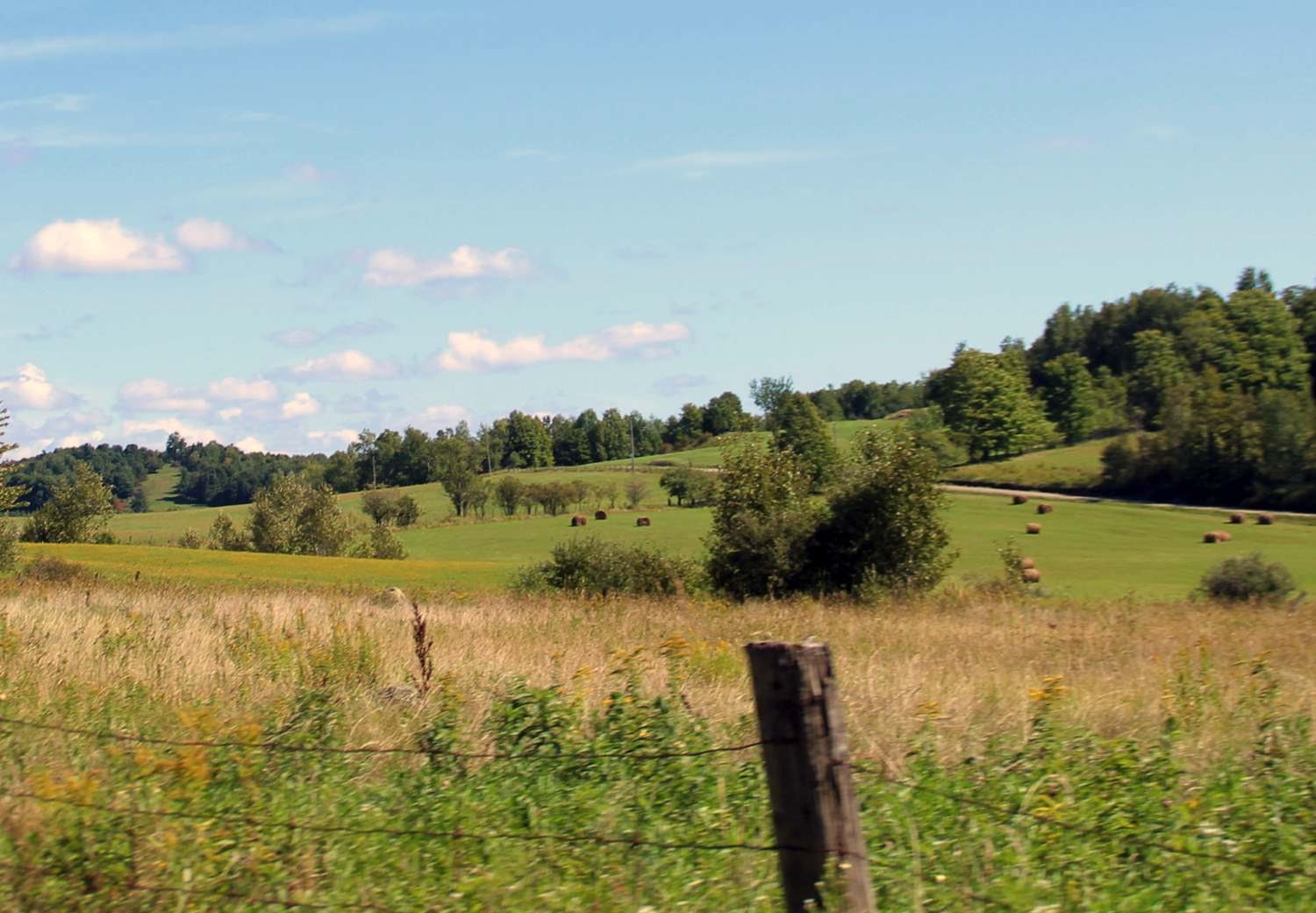

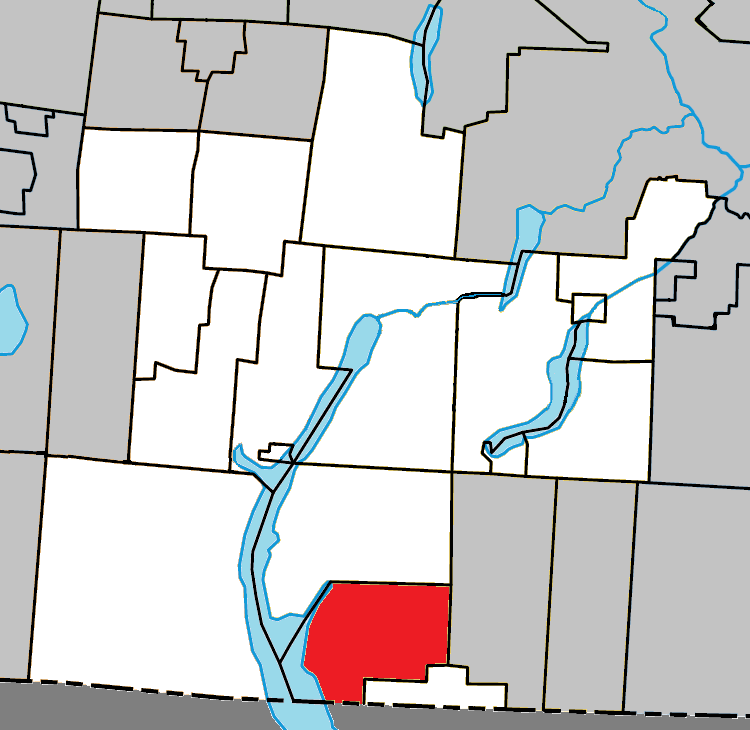
- Location within Memphrémagog RCM

- Location in southern Quebec
- Coordinates: 45°03′N 72°08′W
- Country: Canada
- Province: Quebec
- Region: Estrie
- RCM: Memphrémagog
- Constituted: January 23, 1932

Government
  - Mayor: David Lépine
  - Federal riding: Compton—Stanstead
  - Prov. riding: Orford

Area
  - Total: 84.10 km^{2} (32.47 sq mi)
  - Land: 74.77 km^{2} (28.87 sq mi)

Population (2011)
  - Total: 770
  - Density: 10.3/km^{2} (27/sq mi)
  - Pop 2006-2011: ▲1.0%
  - Dwellings: 522
- Time zone: UTC−5 (EST)
  - Summer (DST): UTC−4 (EDT)
- Postal code(s): J0B 3E3
- Area code: 819
- Highways: R-247
- Website: www.munogden.ca

Ogden is a municipality of about 750 people in Memphrémagog Regional County Municipality in the Estrie region of Quebec, Canada. It includes the hamlets of Tomifobia (formerly Smith's Mills) and Graniteville.

== Demographics ==
=== Population ===
Population trend:

Census	Population	Change (%)
2011	770	▲1.0%
2006	762	0.0%
2001	762	▼0.9%
1996	769	▲3.1%
1991	746	N/A

=== Language ===
Mother tongue (2011)

Language	Population	Pct (%)
French only	365	47.1%
English only	375	48.4%
English and non-official language	5	0.7%
Both English and French	15	1.9%
Other languages	15	1.9%

== Notable people ==
Robert Stanley Weir

== See also ==
- List of anglophone communities in Quebec
- List of municipalities in Quebec
