= Stanstead, Quebec =

Border town in southern Quebec, Canada

Stanstead
- Town
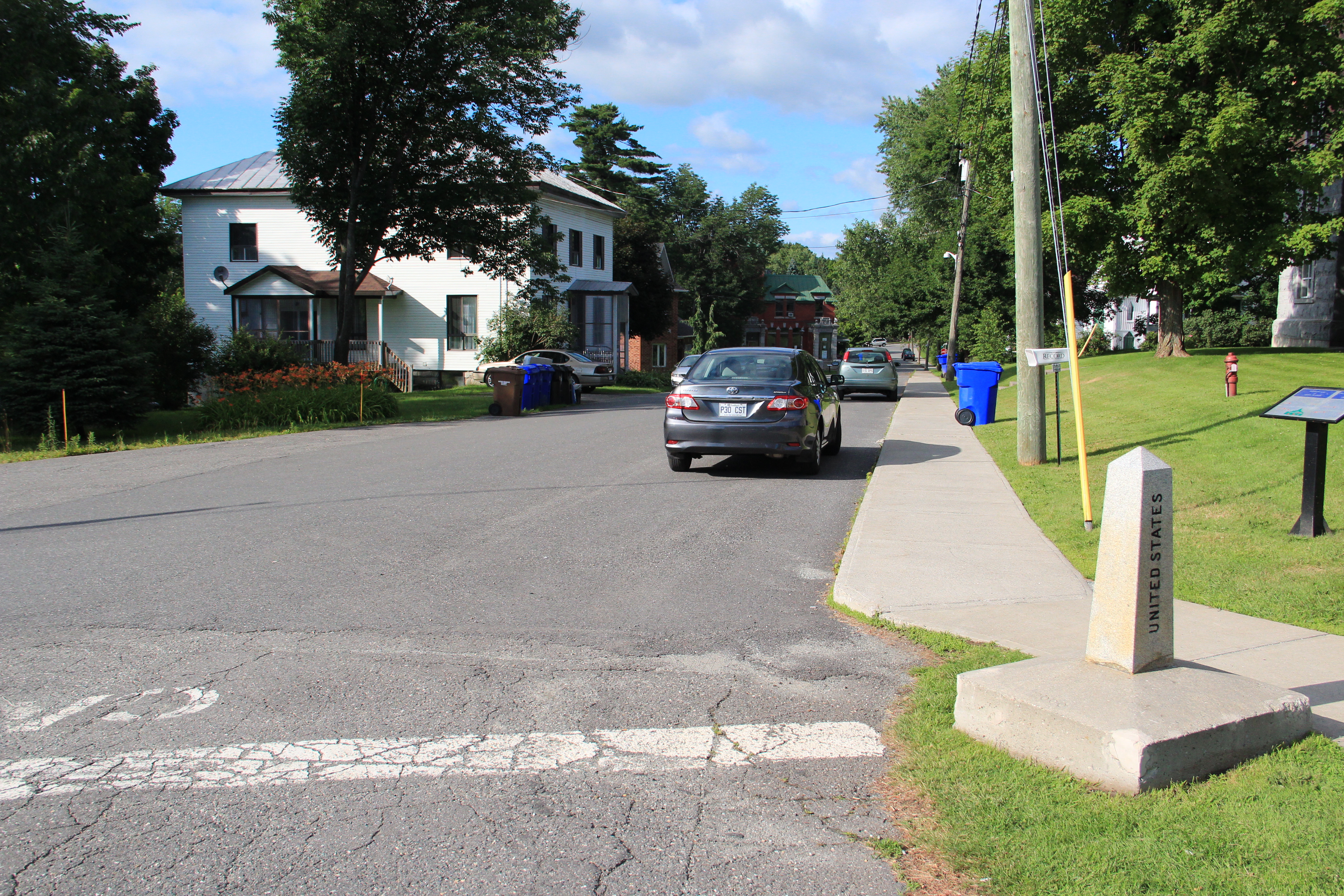
- View of Stanstead from across the Canada–United States border

- Logo
- Nickname: Granite Capital of Canada
- Motto: Three Villages, One Border—Trois Villages, Une Frontière
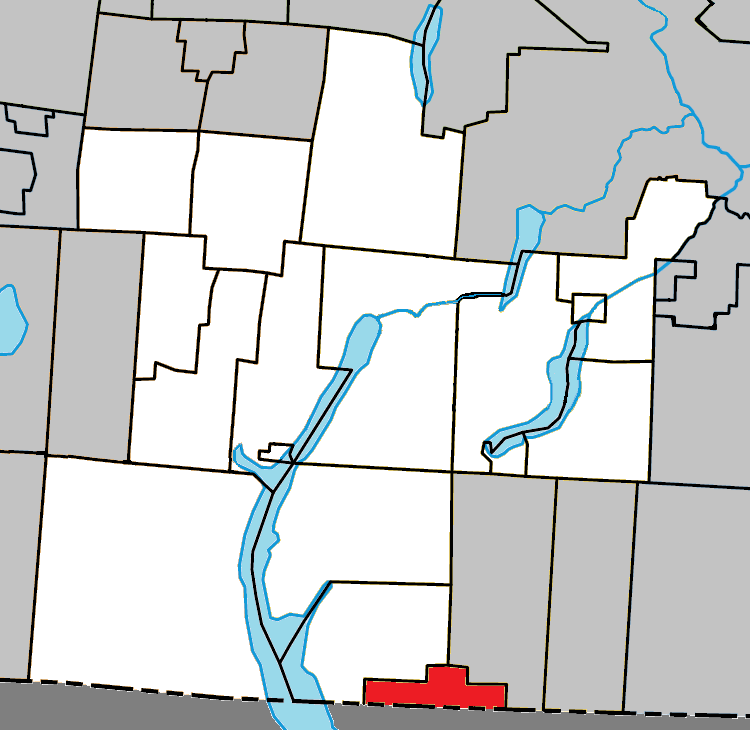
- Location within Memphrémagog RCM

- Location in Quebec
- Coordinates: 45°01′N 72°06′W
- Country: Canada
- Province: Quebec
- Region: Estrie
- RCM: Memphrémagog
- Settled: 1789–1796
- Constituted: February 15, 1995

Government
  - Mayor: Jody Stone
  - Federal riding: Compton—Stanstead
  - Prov. riding: Orford

Area
  - Total: 22.30 km^{2} (8.61 sq mi)
  - Land: 22.72 km^{2} (8.77 sq mi)

Population (2011)
  - Total: 2,857
  - Density: 125.8/km^{2} (326/sq mi)
  - Pop 2006–2011: ▼3.4%
  - Dwellings: 1,361
- Time zone: UTC−5 (EST)
  - Summer (DST): UTC−4 (EDT)
- Postal code(s): J0B 1E0, J0B 2K0, & J0B 3E0
- Area code: 819
- Highways A-55: R-143; R-247
- Website: www.stanstead.ca

Stanstead is a town in the Memphrémagog Regional County Municipality in the Estrie region of Quebec, located on the Canada–United States border across from Derby Line, Vermont.

The Town of Stanstead was created in 1995 by the merger of the former villages of Stanstead Plain and Beebe (formerly Beebe Plain) and the Town of Rock Island. It is not to be confused with the township of Stanstead, which is nearby although not directly adjacent (the municipality of Ogden lies in between). Not only is Stanstead home to the Haskell Free Library and Opera House—the only heritage building deliberately constructed straddling the border between both countries—it also features Canusa Street (Rue Canusa), one of a number of streets in the world where the country border corresponds to the middle line marker, effectively making across-the-street neighbors residents of two countries.

== History ==
Prior to merging, Stanstead Plain, Rock Island and Beebe were known informally as "les trois villages" or "the Three Villages," although originally, "the Three Villages" referred to Stanstead Plain, Rock Island and Derby Line, Vt., each of which ran into the next.

In 1940, traffic on Quebec Route 143—the area's main route at the time—was halted due to snowfall from March 22 to April 3. Dufferin Heights was most affected. As volunteers attempted to clear the road with shovels, the snow banks became so high that steps needed to be carved into them. Trains were similarly affected, although able to dig out more quickly.

=== Stanstead Plain ===
Stanstead Plain was founded in 1796 by Johnson Taplin, who came from New England in search of good farming land.

The Mansur (red brick) one-room school was built in 1819. It is the oldest one-room school remaining in Quebec.

The town grew in the 19th century, due to the influx of United Empire Loyalists and the development of the granite industry. In 1855, the village was incorporated by the Quebec legislature. The town was the main centre of commerce of the region through the late 18th century, though eventually losing pre-eminence to Sherbrooke. Stanstead was also at one time the seat of the former Stanstead County.

The first automobile manufactured in Canada was built by Henry Seth Taylor of Stanstead. Taylor demonstrated his steam buggy at the Stanstead Fair in 1867.

The railroad reached Stanstead in 1871. Today its tracks have been transformed into bike trails owned by the regional government.

A seminary built here in 1829 became Stanstead College in 1873. In 1884, Ursulines opened a convent here which operated a Francophone college. The convent and the school both closed in 2004. The word "college" here designates a high school in each case. Starting 2011, the convent became an elders residence named the "Manoir Stanstead" (Stanstead Manor).

In 1878, the Governor General of Canada, Lord Dufferin, and his wife visited the town. The main road over which they travelled was renamed "Rue Dufferin" (Dufferin Street).

=== Rock Island ===
Rock Island was settled in 1798 by Samuel and Selah Pomroy from Massachusetts. In 1802, a bridge was built across the Tomifobia River to ease access to Derby Line. The following year, Col. Charles Kilborn built a saw mill and a corn mill, then set up a dam on the river to feed them. A few years later, a channel was dug in the bend of the river. The territory located between the channel and the river was named "Rock Island".

Rock Island was incorporated as a village in 1892, and became a town in 1957.

Rock Island is known for the Haskell Free Library and Opera House, deliberately constructed on the Canada–US border and opened in 1904. The original owners were a couple with dual nationality; Mr. Carlos F. Haskell was an American businessman from Derby Line who owned a number of sawmills, while Mrs. Haskell was born in Canada. The intent was that people on both sides of the border would have use of the facility, which is now a designated historic site. Visitors today may still enter the facility from the Canadian or American sides, though those who use it as a border crossing must report to their respective customs office.

Another famous native of Rock Island is Henrietta Banting (1912–1976), the wife of Frederick Banting, co-discoverer of insulin in 1922. The Bantings donated some land to the town, and the municipal authorities recognized them by naming a public park in their honour in 1981 (located on the north side of Rue Notre-Dame Ouest (Notre-Dame West Street) going westbound towards Dufferin).

It is also the home of the Dairy Association Company, the manufacturers of Bag Balm.

The Butterfield factory closed in 1982 after a lengthy strike by Canadian workers.

=== Beebe Plain ===
Beebe Plain was colonized around 1789 by Zeeba Beebe of Connecticut. A saw mill was established as the town's first business in 1863. By 1869, Beebe Plain had a church, two stores, a post office, a customs post and some houses. The village separated from the township of Stanstead and became a separate municipality. From 1874 to 1935, a Chautauqua-style holiday resort, including a meeting hall, a dining room and about 30 country cottages, attracted thousands of people, mainly Americans from New York and Boston. The granite industry is the major force in the area's economic history.

Beebe Junction was the international crossing point for the 1870 Massawippi Valley Railway (later the Quebec Central Railway, leased by Canadian Pacific Railway and abandoned in 1990). The line ran from the Canadian Pacific mainline in Sherbrooke-Lennoxville south to Newport, Vermont, where onward connections were available via White River Junction to New York City and Boston. The last Quebec City-Sherbrooke-Newport passenger train ran in 1960. The historic Beebe station is now a private residence.

A building located at 3, Rue Principale (Main Street) is in a similar state to the Haskell Library—a line runs through its north aisle. In this case, however, Canadian citizens are not allowed to access the building without reporting to the U.S. customs first, and then to the Canadian customs when going back.

Access to homes on Rue Canusa (Canusa Street) is made through the Canada–US border. U.S. citizens residing there have to report to their customs if travelling south, and to the Canadian customs if travelling elsewhere in Beebe.

== Geography ==
The Tomifobia River runs through the town of Stanstead, dividing the Canada–US border at times. Along portions of Canada's Rue Canusa (Canusa Street), houses on the southern end of the street lie entirely within Vermont, while their driveways direct northward, and connect to the street in Quebec, as the northern portions of their properties are within Canada. These residents' backyard neighbours are American, while families living right across the street are Canadian, though no noticeable boundary exists between the two (the street itself is entirely within Canada). In other places, the international border runs through individual homes, so that meals prepared in one country are eaten in the other. An entire tool-and-die factory, once operated by the Butterfield division of Litton Industries, is also divided in two by the border.

=== Climate ===
As typical of southern Quebec, Stanstead has a humid continental climate (Köppen climate classification: Dfb) with significant differences of temperature between seasons. Summers are warm but rarely hot and are in general cooler than areas further west on similar parallels. Winters are cold considering its southerly latitude, further demonstrating the continental nature of the climate. The climate is relatively wet resulting in plenty of snowfall in winter.

Climate data for Stanstead
Month	Jan	Feb	Mar	Apr	May	Jun	Jul	Aug	Sep	Oct	Nov	Dec	Year
Record high °C (°F)	17.2 (63.0)	15 (59)	22.8 (73.0)	29.4 (84.9)	32.2 (90.0)	33.5 (92.3)	34.4 (93.9)	33.3 (91.9)	31.1 (88.0)	27.8 (82.0)	23.3 (73.9)	15.6 (60.1)	34.4 (93.9)
Mean daily maximum °C (°F)	−5 (23)	−3.1 (26.4)	2.5 (36.5)	10.1 (50.2)	18.1 (64.6)	21.8 (71.2)	24.6 (76.3)	23 (73)	18.1 (64.6)	11.5 (52.7)	4.4 (39.9)	−2.1 (28.2)	10.3 (50.6)
Daily mean °C (°F)	−10.2 (13.6)	−8.6 (16.5)	−2.7 (27.1)	4.7 (40.5)	11.9 (53.4)	16.3 (61.3)	19 (66)	17.6 (63.7)	13 (55)	6.9 (44.4)	0.6 (33.1)	−6.8 (19.8)	5.1 (41.2)
Mean daily minimum °C (°F)	−15.3 (4.5)	−14.1 (6.6)	−7.9 (17.8)	−0.8 (30.6)	5.7 (42.3)	10.7 (51.3)	13.4 (56.1)	12.2 (54.0)	7.9 (46.2)	2.2 (36.0)	−3.2 (26.2)	−11.5 (11.3)	−0.1 (31.9)
Record low °C (°F)	−39.4 (−38.9)	−35 (−31)	−31.7 (−25.1)	−20.6 (−5.1)	−8.3 (17.1)	−5 (23)	1 (34)	−1.1 (30.0)	−6.5 (20.3)	−12.2 (10.0)	−24.5 (−12.1)	−35.5 (−31.9)	−39.4 (−38.9)
Average precipitation mm (inches)	82 (3.2)	62 (2.4)	80 (3.1)	82 (3.2)	102 (4.0)	123 (4.8)	112 (4.4)	117 (4.6)	98 (3.9)	96 (3.8)	104 (4.1)	97 (3.8)	1,155 (45.3)

== Demographics ==
In the 2021 Census of Population conducted by Statistics Canada, Stanstead had a population of 2,824 living in 1,274 of its 1,381 total private dwellings, a change of 1.3% from its 2016 population of 2,788. With a land area of 21.95 km^{2} (8.47 sq mi), it had a population density of 128.7/km^{2} (333.2/sq mi) in 2021.

Population trend:

Census	Population	Change (%)
2011	2,857	▼3.4%
2006	2,957	▼1.3%
2001	2,995	▼3.8%
1996	3,112	▲0.4%
1991	3,101	N/A

Mother tongue (2011)

Language	Population	Pct (%)
English only	1,465	51.6%
French only	1,250	44.0%
Both English and French	85	3.0%
Non-official languages	40	1.4%

== Government ==
The town of Stanstead was created in 1995 by the merger of the former towns of Stanstead Plain, Rock Island and Beebe Plain. The mayor is Jody Stone. There are six town councilors.

== Economy ==
The Canadian side of the former Butterfield building is being used by small industrial businesses, such as the Sealander Waterworks as a demonstration plant for renewable energy.

== Attractions ==
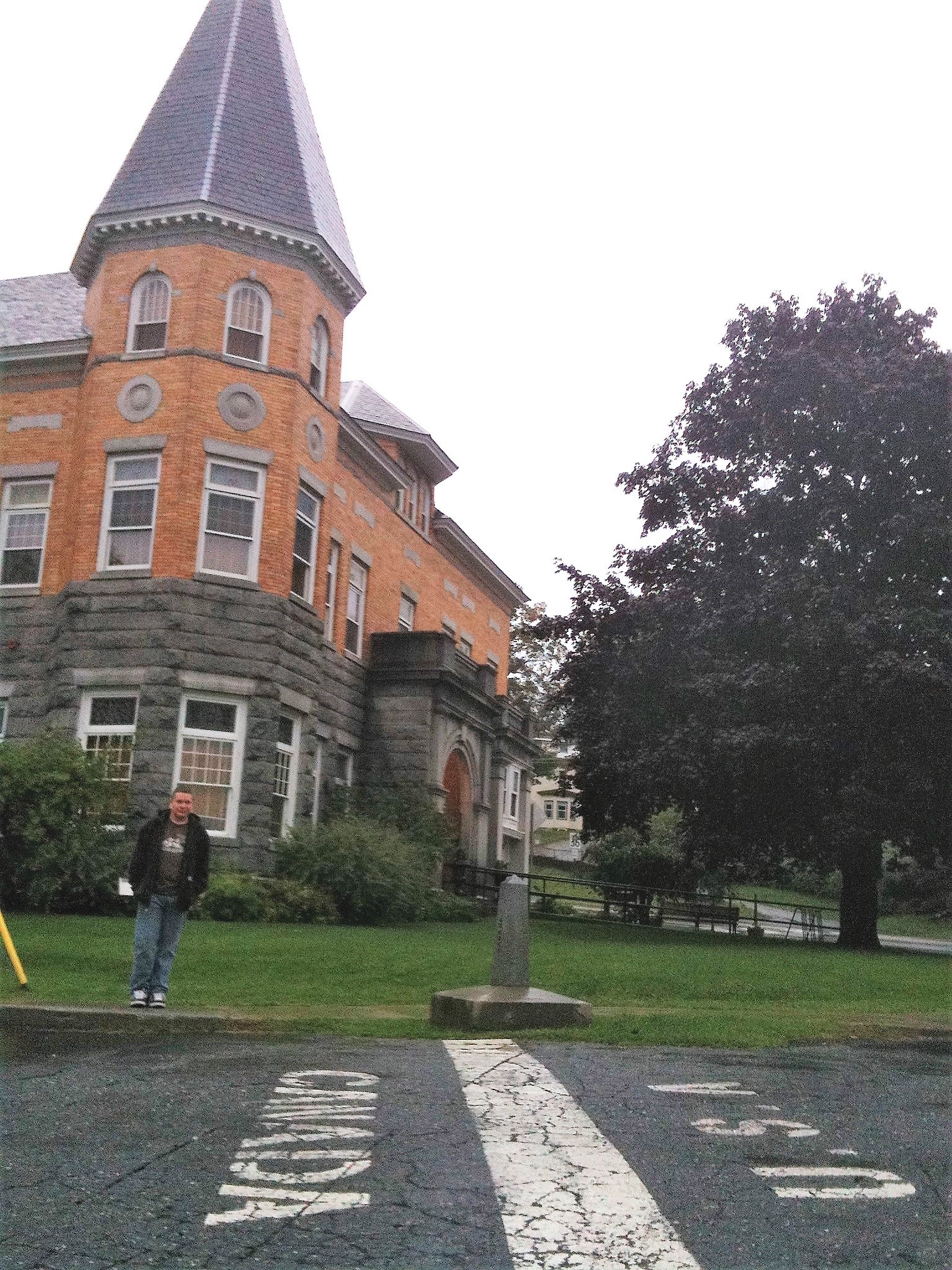
The Haskell Free Library straddles the US-Canadian border

The Haskell Free Library and Opera House has an international border line painted on the floors of the building. Another landmark is Centenary United Church.

Stanstead, which refers to itself as the Granite Capital of Canada, was previously home to a granite-themed museum known as "Granit Central". This museum closed in October 2017 citing years of financial challenges. Another museum in the town is the Colby-Curtis Museum, which is focused on the town's history.

== Infrastructure ==
Drinking water for the adjacent towns of Derby Line and Stanstead is pumped from wells in Canada, stored in a reservoir in the United States and distributed through a system maintained by Canadians. Derby Line's sewage makes a cross-border trip for treatment.

=== Roads ===
- Quebec Autoroute 55
- Quebec Route 143
- Quebec Route 247

== Education ==
Stanstead College is located here. There are also two elementary schools: Sunnyside Elementary School, an English school; and Jardin des Frontières, a French school. Sunnyside was built on top of the location of Sunnyside Castle, located beside the Stanstead Town Hall and across the street from the White House, a former old folks home after it was owned by Dr. White.

== Media ==
The Stanstead Journal, an English-language weekly newspaper founded in 1845, was published until May 29, 2019.

== Sports ==
There is a curling club which recruits members from both sides of the border. In 2011, the Pat Burns Arena was constructed. It is the largest indoor hockey rink and sports complex within a 30 km radius in Canada and 20 km radius in the U.S., and is named after the National Hockey League coach Pat Burns.

== See also ==
- Johns River (Vermont)
- List of anglophone communities in Quebec
- List of towns in Quebec
