= Derby Line, Vermont =

Village in Orleans County, Vermont, United States

- Village
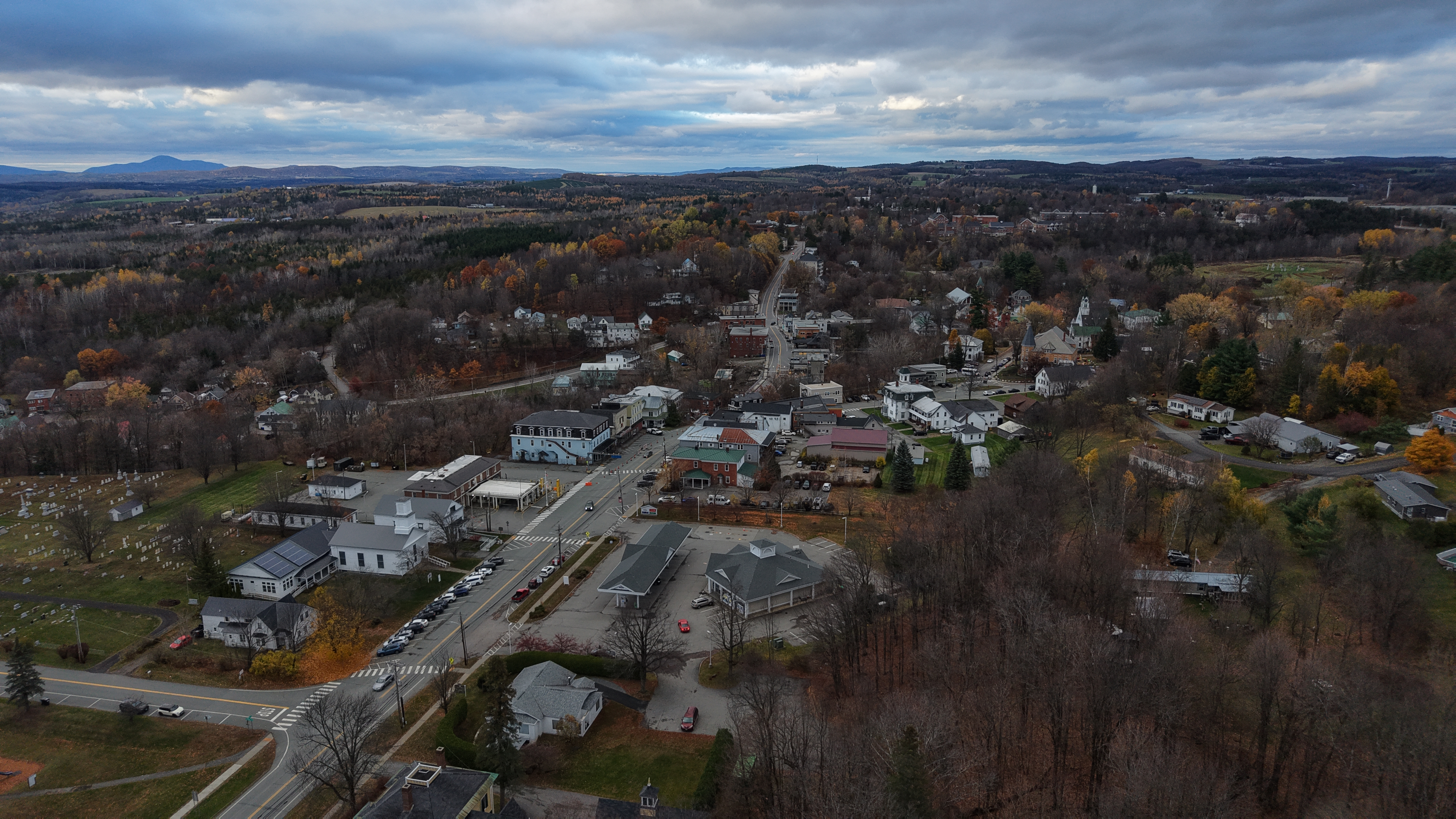
- Derby Line, VT, from the south

- Location within Vermont Location within the United States
- Coordinates: 45°0′N 72°6′W
- Country: United States
- State: Vermont
- County: Orleans County
- Town: Derby
- Organized: June 16, 1977

Area
  - Total: 0.73 sq mi (1.89 km^{2})
  - Land: 0.73 sq mi (1.88 km^{2})
  - Water: 0.0039 sq mi (0.01 km^{2})
- Elevation: 1,017 ft (310 m)

Population (2020)
  - Total: 687
  - Density: 946/sq mi (365/km^{2})
- Time zone: UTC-5 (EST)
  - Summer (DST): UTC-4 (EDT)
- ZIP code: 05830
- Area code: 802
- FIPS code: 50-17500
- GNIS feature ID: 2378304

Derby Line is an incorporated village in the town of Derby in Orleans County, Vermont, United States, slightly north of the 45th parallel, the nominal U.S.–Canada boundary. The population was 687 at the 2020 census.

The village is located on the Canada–United States border and is contiguous with the district of Rock Island in the town of Stanstead, Quebec.

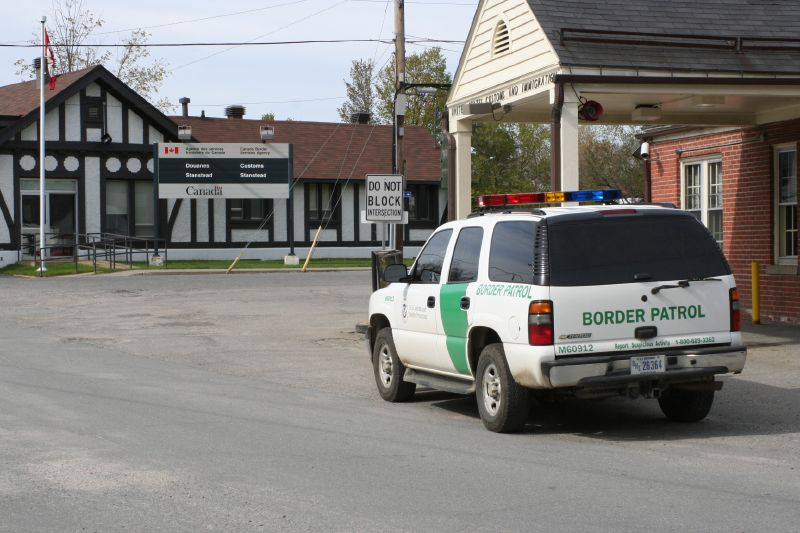
The US Canada border

Notable buildings include the Haskell Free Library and Opera House.

== History ==
The village was incorporated in 1791. It lies on an elevation at the far north of Derby, which was chartered on October 29, 1779, and first settled in 1795. By 1859, the area was noted for the beauty of its farmhouses and luxuriant farmland, set before the distant vista of Lake Memphremagog and the Green Mountains.

Because of an erratic survey, the border separating Canada from the United States was drawn incorrectly by the surveyors in the 18th century, above the 45th parallel which was the agreed boundary. Derby Line was founded based on that line, above the 45th parallel. The boundary was confirmed by the Webster–Ashburton Treaty in 1842.

== Description ==
Derby Line is known for the Haskell Free Library and Opera House, a line house deliberately constructed on the international border and opened in 1904. The founders were a binational couple: Carlos F. Haskell was a local American businessman who owned a number of sawmills, while Martha Stewart Haskell was Canadian. The intent was that people on both sides of the border would have use of the facility, which is now a designated historic site. Patrons of the library from either side of the border may use the facility without going through border security.

Besides the library, five inhabited structures are divided by the border. Most residents use the US entrances to avoid problems with the border patrol; crossing the border within buildings does not require official permission. A tool-and-die factory, once operated by the Butterfield division of Litton Industries, is also divided. The factory in Canada closed in 1982 after a lengthy strike by Canadian workers. The factory in Derby Line is open. It was bought in 1988 by Group Tivoly, a cutting tools company based in France, and has 160 employees.

There are ramifications to living directly on the border of another country. For example, the US Border Patrol expressed a desire to close off streets (such as Canusa Street) which have historically run together with those of Stanstead Town. Border officials were concerned about illegal immigration. In 2007, the village of Derby Line met with the Mayor and Council of Stanstead in joint session in Québec, to be addressed by the authorities. This meant that the Vermont village's trustee meeting was held in a foreign country, following Vermont procedural rules.

A telephone call between Derby Line, Vermont, and Rock Island, Québec, is local.

== Geography ==
According to the United States Census Bureau, the village has a total area of 0.7 square miles (1.8 km^{2}), all land.

=== Climate ===
Climate data for Derby Line, Vermont
Month	Jan	Feb	Mar	Apr	May	Jun	Jul	Aug	Sep	Oct	Nov	Dec	Year
Record high °F (°C)	64 (18)	62 (17)	83 (28)	87 (31)	92 (33)	95 (35)	98 (37)	95 (35)	96 (36)	84 (29)	74 (23)	66 (19)	98 (37)
Mean daily maximum °F (°C)	26 (−3)	31 (−1)	41 (5)	54 (12)	69 (21)	77 (25)	81 (27)	79 (26)	70 (21)	57 (14)	43 (6)	31 (−1)	55 (13)
Mean daily minimum °F (°C)	6 (−14)	8 (−13)	19 (−7)	31 (−1)	43 (6)	52 (11)	57 (14)	55 (13)	47 (8)	37 (3)	27 (−3)	13 (−11)	33 (1)
Record low °F (°C)	−38 (−39)	−38 (−39)	−32 (−36)	−2 (−19)	20 (−7)	28 (−2)	36 (2)	32 (0)	23 (−5)	0 (−18)	−7 (−22)	−40 (−40)	−40 (−40)
Average precipitation inches (mm)	2.96 (75)	2.16 (55)	2.96 (75)	2.93 (74)	3.67 (93)	3.93 (100)	4.19 (106)	4.18 (106)	3.76 (96)	3.45 (88)	3.47 (88)	3.12 (79)	40.78 (1,035)
Average snowfall inches (cm)	24.7 (63)	17.2 (44)	18.8 (48)	6.9 (18)	0.2 (0.51)	0 (0)	0 (0)	0 (0)	0.1 (0.25)	1.1 (2.8)	11 (28)	23.1 (59)	103.1 (263.56)

== Demographics ==
Historical population
Census	Pop.	Note	%±
1900	309		—
1910	390		26.2%
1920	640		64.1%
1930	683		6.7%
1940	661		−3.2%
1950	767		16.0%
1960	849		10.7%
1970	834		−1.8%
1980	874		4.8%
1990	855		−2.2%
2000	776		−9.2%
2010	673		−13.3%
2020	687		2.1%
U.S. Decennial Census

As of the census of 2000, there were 776 people, 329 households, and 225 families residing in the village. The population density was 1,057.5/sq mi (408.3/km^{2}). There were 364 housing units at an average density of 496.0 per square mile (192.5/km^{2}). The racial makeup of the village was 96.78% White, 0.39% African American, 0.90% Native American, 0.64% Asian, and 1.29% from two or more races. Hispanic or Latino of any race were 0.13% of the population.

There were 329 households, out of which 31.6% had children under the age of 18 living with them, 52.6% were married couples living together, 11.6% had a female householder with no husband present, and 31.6% were non-families. 27.1% of all households were made up of individuals, and 11.9% had someone living alone who was 65 years of age or older. The average household size was 2.36 and the average family size was 2.80.

In the village, the population was spread out, with 24.7% under the age of 18, 7.0% from 18 to 24, 25.6% from 25 to 44, 26.5% from 45 to 64, and 16.1% who were 65 years of age or older. The median age was 39 years. For every 100 females, there were 92.1 males. For every 100 females age 18 and over, there were 86.0 males.

== Economy ==
=== Personal income ===
The median income for a household in the village was $33,966, and the median income for a family was $37,375. Males had a median income of $30,208 versus $21,667 for females. The per capita income for the village was $15,202. About 11.4% of families and 12.8% of the population were below the poverty line, including 17.8% of those under age 18 and 11.9% of those age 65 or over.

=== Industry ===
A local subsidiary of an international tool manufacturer employs 180 workers from the area.

== Infrastructure ==
=== Roads ===
The village is the northern terminus of both Interstate 91 and US 5, which both continue northward into Québec as Quebec Autoroute 55 and Quebec Route 143 respectively.

=== Water ===
Drinking water for the adjacent towns of Derby Line and Stanstead is pumped from wells in Canada, stored in a reservoir in the United States and distributed through a system maintained by Canadians. Derby Line's sewage makes a cross-border trip for treatment.

Derby Line shares emergency crews with Stanstead. Each responds to calls on both sides of the border.

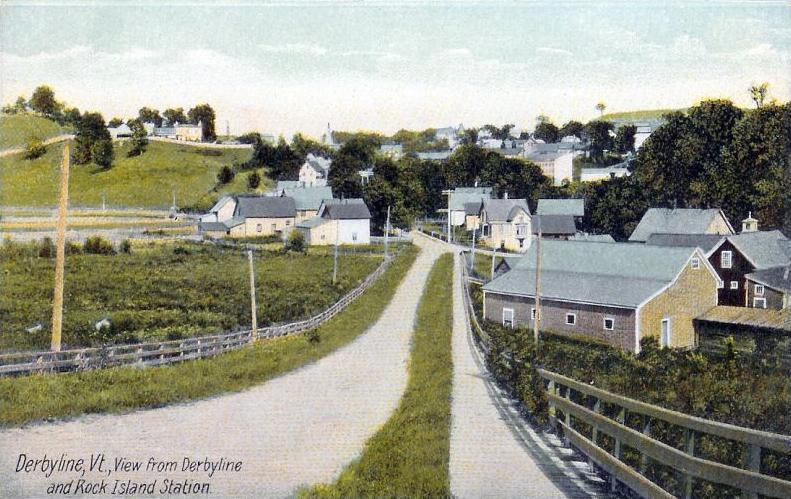
View from station c. 1908

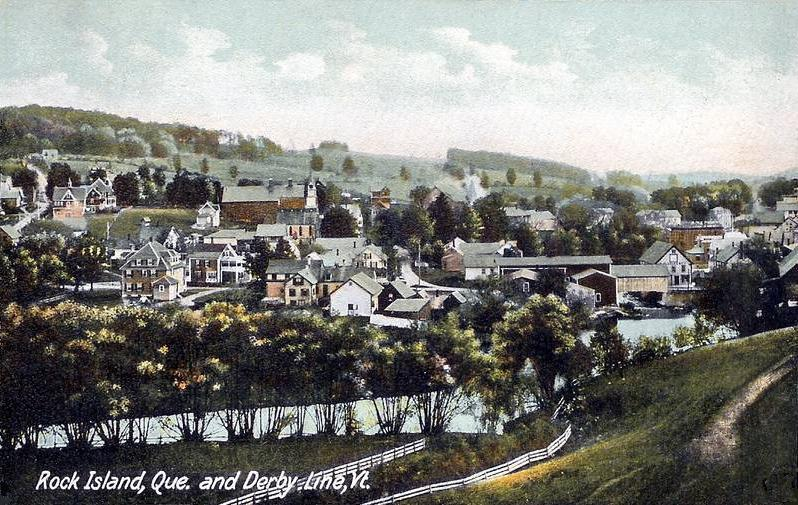
The twin villages c. 1906

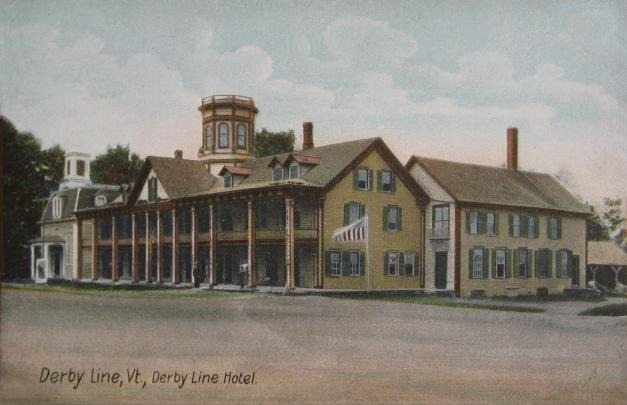
Derby Line Hotel c. 1908

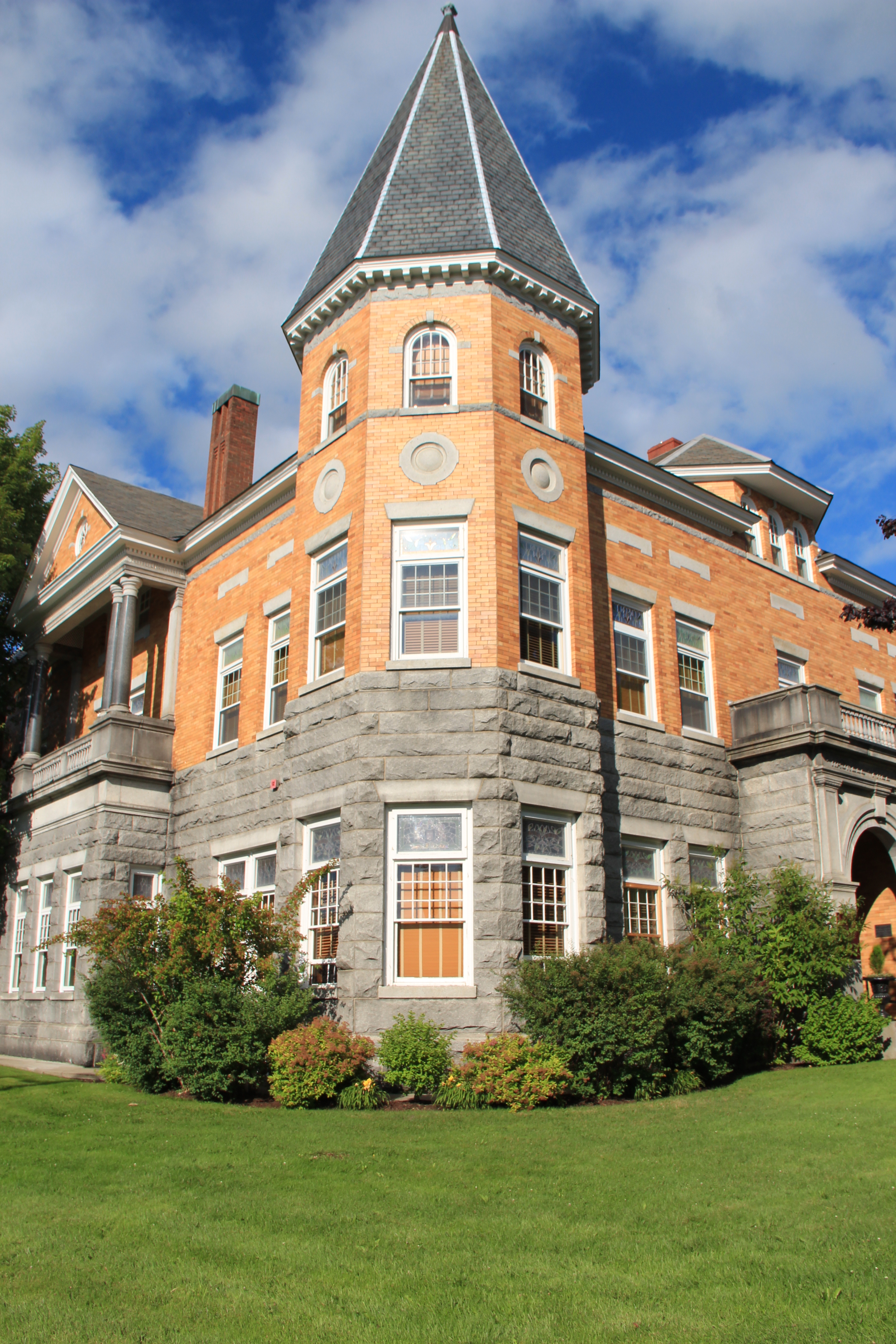
Haskell Free Library on the US-Canada border, 2012
