= Quebec Route 247 =

Highway in Quebec, Canada

Route 247

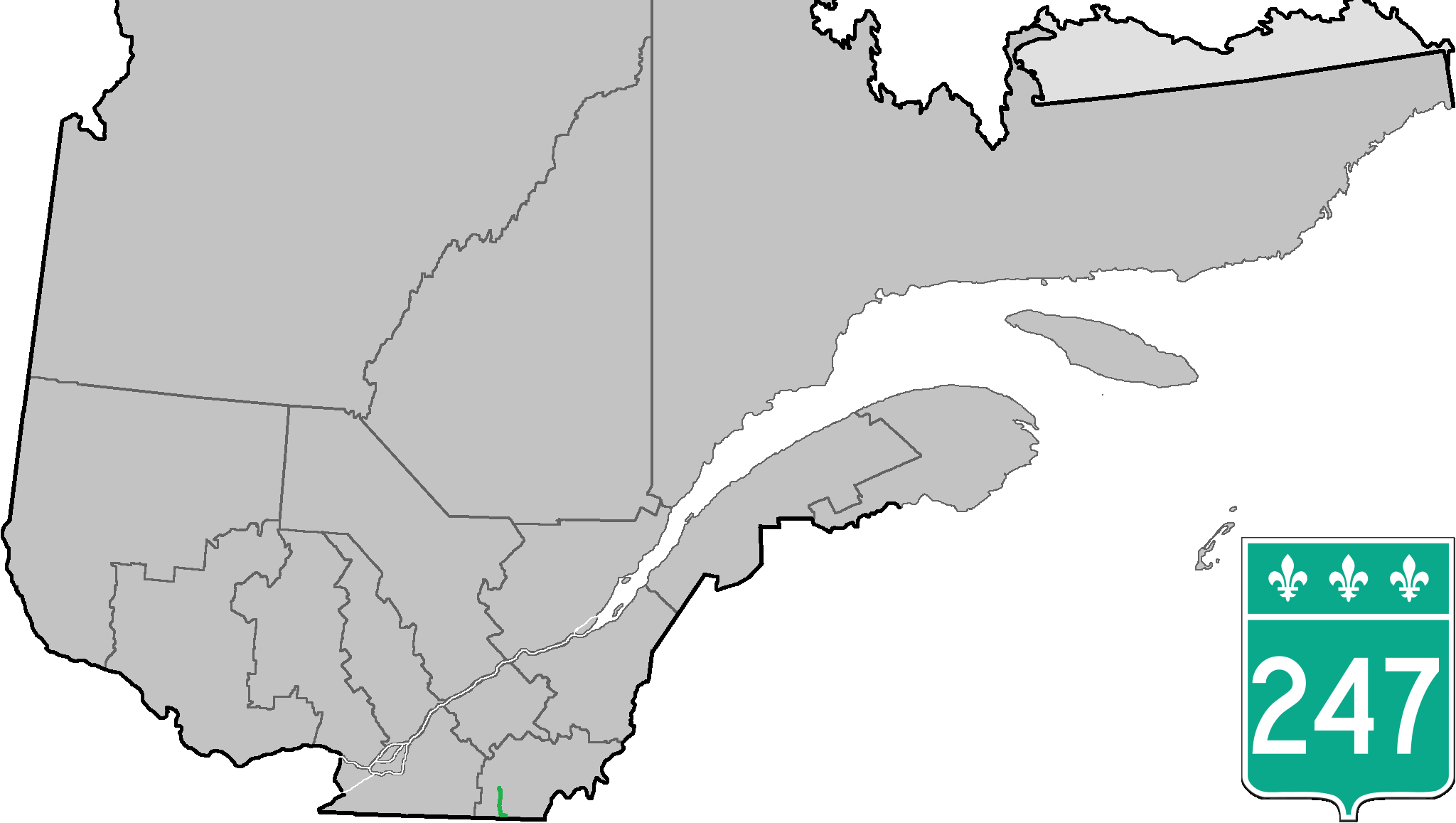

Route information
- Maintained by Transports Québec
- Length: 42.4 km (26.3 mi)

Major junctions
- South end: A-55 in Stanstead
- R-143 in Stanstead (Rock Island)
- North end: R-141 in Magog

Location
- Country: Canada
- Province: Quebec

Highway system
- Quebec provincial highways; Autoroutes; List; Former
← R-245	→ R-249

Route 247 is a north/south highway on the south shore of the Saint Lawrence River in the Estrie region of Quebec. Its northern terminus is in Magog at the junction of Route 112 and its southern terminus is in Stanstead, at the junction of Autoroute 55 less than 1 kilometre north of the Canada–United States border.

Part of this highway straddles the Canada–United States border along Canusa Street, separating Beebe Plain, Vermont from Beebe Plain, Quebec.

== Municipalities along Route 247 ==
- Stanstead (ville)
- Ogden
- Stanstead (township)
- Magog
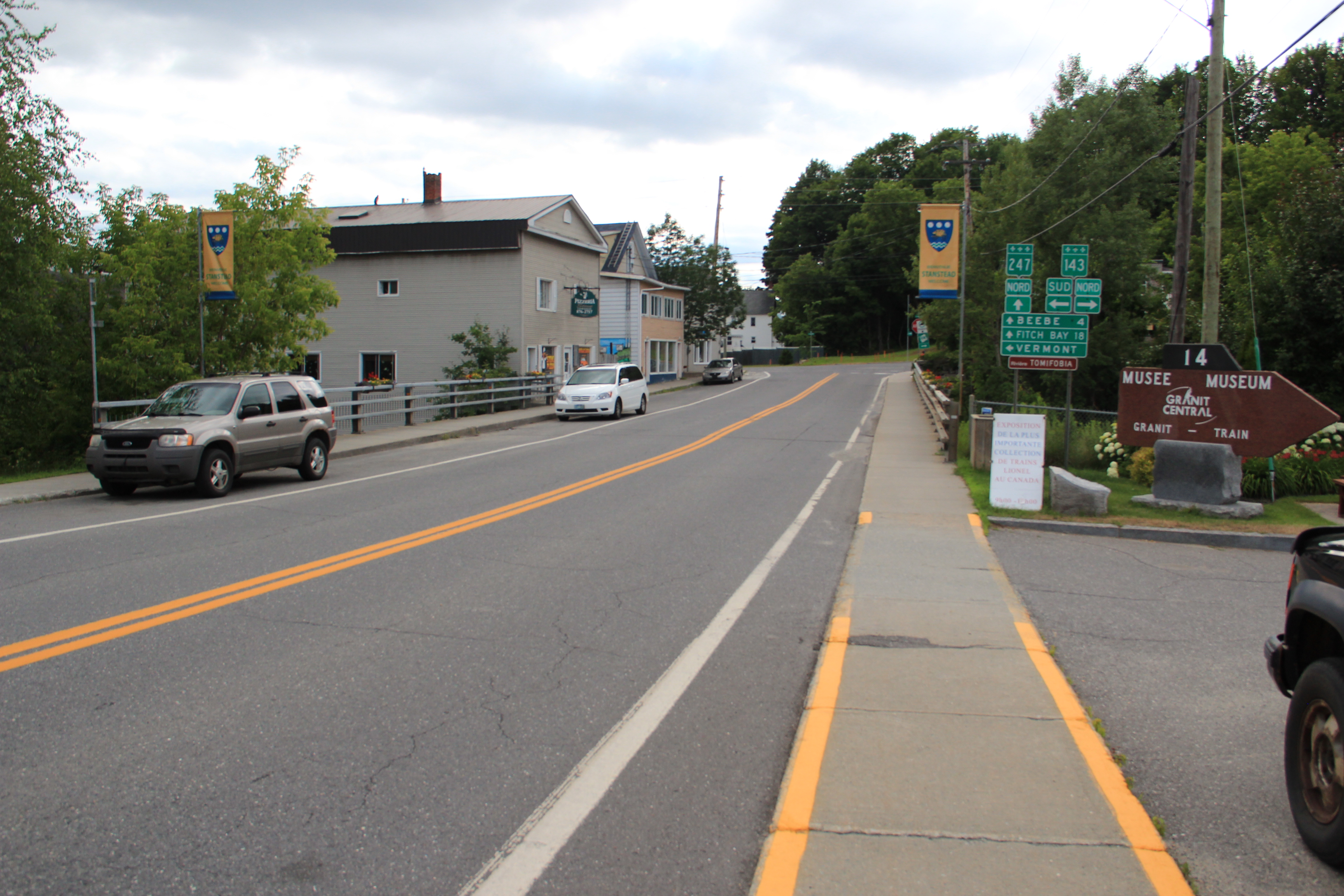
Bridge over Tomifobia River in Stanstead.

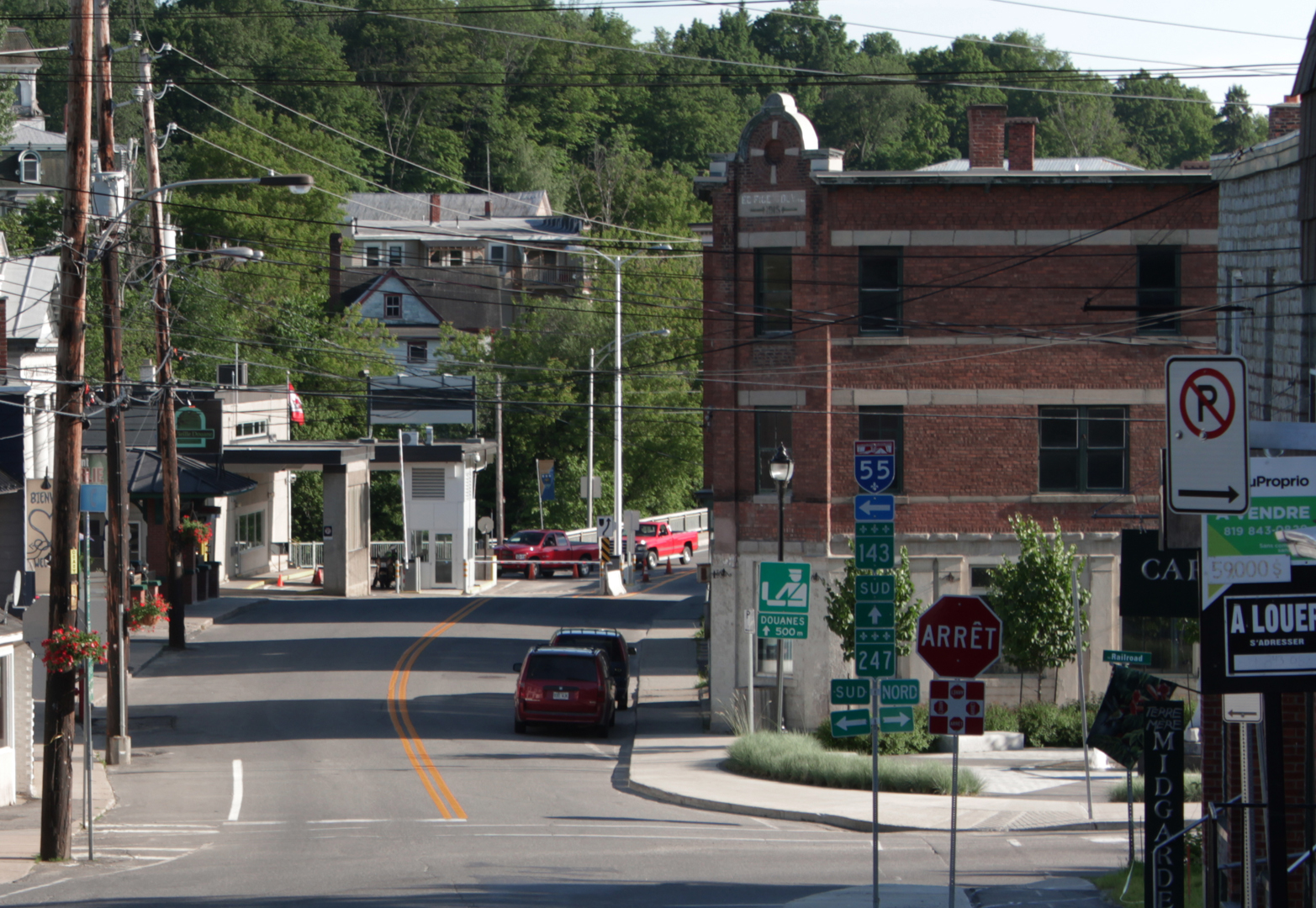
Route 247 parallels Canada-US Border in Stanstead.

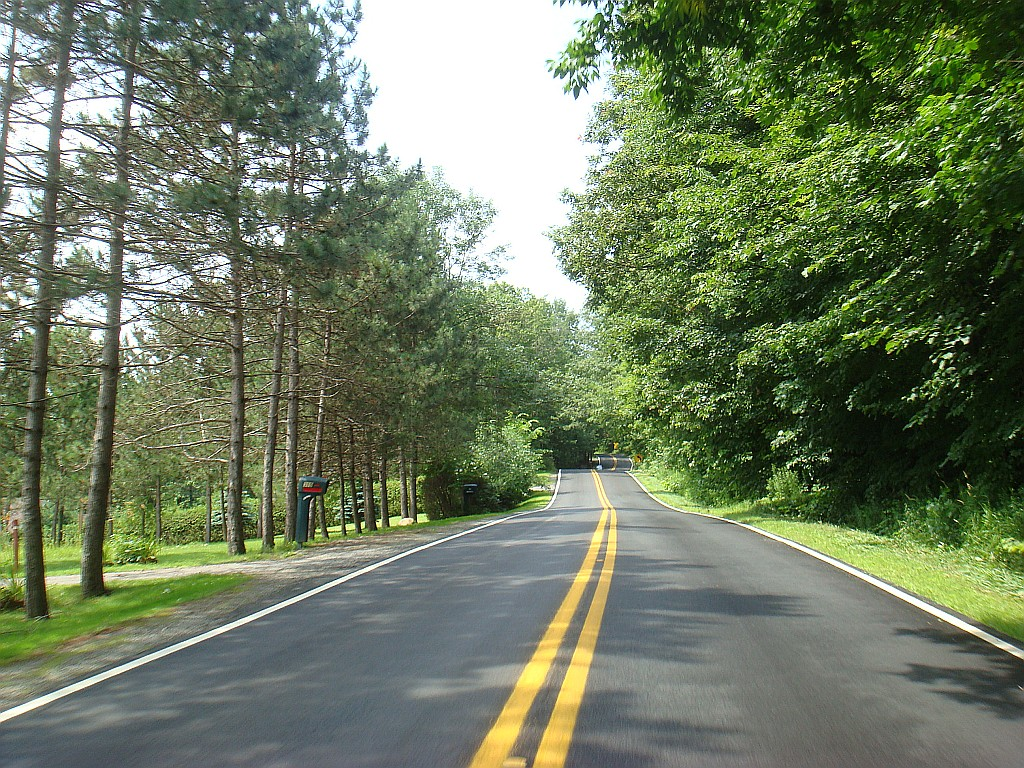
Quebec Route 247 in Stanstead.

== See also ==
- List of Quebec provincial highways
