= Governor Post =

Governor Post may refer to:

- Nathan Post (1881–1938), 8th and 10th Governor of American Samoa
- Regis Henri Post (1870–1944), Governor of Puerto Rico from 1907 to 1909
