= Governor Stearns =

Governor Stearns may refer to:

- Clark Daniel Stearns (1870–1944), 9th Governor of American Samoa
- Marcellus Stearns (1839–1891), 11th Governor of Florida
- Onslow Stearns (1810–1878), 32nd Governor of New Hampshire
