= William Michael Crose =

United States naval officer

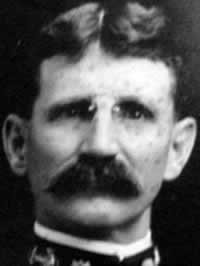

Governor of American Samoa
- In office November 10, 1910 – March 14, 1913
- President: William Howard Taft
- Preceded by: John Frederick Parker
- Succeeded by: Nathan Woodworth Post

Personal details
- Born: February 9, 1867 Greencastle, Indiana
- Died: April 4, 1929 (aged 62) San Diego, California
- Education: United States Naval Academy
- Occupation: Naval officer
- Awards: Navy Cross

Military service
- Allegiance: United States
- Branch/service: United States Navy
- Rank: Captain
- Commands: USS North Dakota (BB-29); USS Princeton (PG-13)

William Michael Crose (February 8, 1867 – April 4, 1929) was a United States Navy Captain and the seventh Naval Governor of American Samoa, from November 10, 1910, to March 14, 1913. He was the first person designated "Governor of American Samoa", rather than the previous "Governor of Tutuila".

== Life and career ==
=== Early life ===
Crose was born in Greencastle, Indiana, on February 8, 1867. He was appointed to the United States Naval Academy on May 19, 1884, and graduated in 1888.

=== Naval career ===
The United States Department of the Navy awarded Crose the Navy Cross for "exceptionally meritorious service in a duty of great responsibility as Commanding Officer of the U.S.S. NORTH DAKOTA in the Atlantic Fleet, during World War I." On July 1, 1890, Crose was commissioned into the United States Navy as an ensign. On May 10, 1898, he became a lieutenant (junior grade), and a lieutenant on March 3, 1898. He was stationed on USS Galena in 1888, USS Marion in 1890, the Naval Hydrographic office in 1894, USS Pinta in 1895, USS Wheeling the same year, the Bureau of Equipment in 1898, and USS Kentucky in 1900.

== Governorship ==
On November 10, 1910, Crose relieved Captain John Frederick Parker of command of United States Naval Station Tutuila, becoming the seventh Naval Governor of American Samoa. While Governor, Crose appointed a board of education, composed of a naval chaplain, a naval assistant surgeon, and the wife of a local school teacher. He also pushed for the renaming of the island Naval Post, claiming the name Tutuila was inadequate, as the territory contained additional islands other than Tutuila, and recommending a new name of either "American Samoa" or "Eastern Samoa", a wish he expressed to the Secretary of the Navy in a 1911 letter. On July 17, 1911, the island was officially designated "American Samoa", and President of the United States William Howard Taft recommissioned Crose as "Governor of American Samoa", rather than "Governor of Tutuila" on October 24, 1912.

In 1910, approximately nine miles of new roads were constructed in Tutuila and eight and a half miles of existing roads were repaired. Several bridges were reinforced using Australian hardwood, and dynamite was employed to blast passages through coral reefs, transforming the island's traditional boat routes. Despite these efforts, U.S. Navy officials remained dissatisfied with the overall pace of infrastructure development. In 1911, Crose remarked that “there are no roads in Tutuila which would be dignified by that name in the United States,” attributing this situation to Samoans’ reluctance to engage in road construction without full compensation. In response, Crose instituted measures in October 1911 requiring Samoan villages to supply labor for road projects. For roads deemed to have “public utility,” the naval administration agreed to cover half of the labor costs and to provide materials for blasting and bridge building. In cases where roads were considered to have only “local importance,” the government offered construction materials alone. Samoans who refused to participate in such projects could be fined at double the daily wage for each day of noncompliance or face four days of imprisonment. As incarcerated individuals could be legally compelled to work, this policy effectively introduced a system of forced labor.

Crose also amended laws on firearms, perjury, road maintenance, and importation of animals. On March 14, 1913, Crose transferred command to Nathan Woodworth Post.

== Post-governorship ==
Crose died in San Diego on April 4, 1929, and was buried at sea.
