= Lyndon Institute =

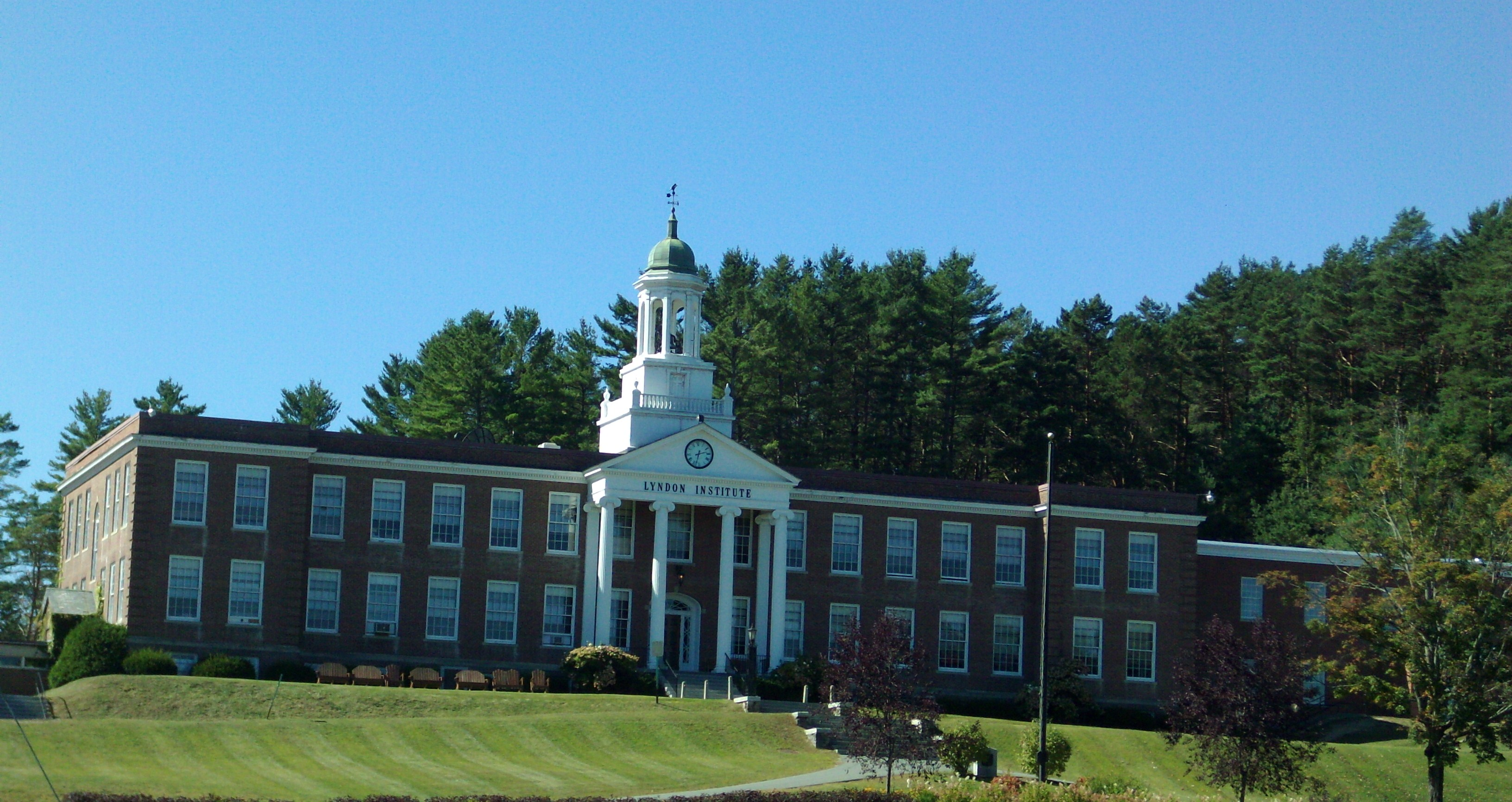

Location
- Lyndon, Vermont; United States; 44.5382342°N 72.0156225°W

Information
- Type: Private boarding
- Motto: Per Aspera Ad Astra (Through hardship to the stars)
- Established: 1867; 159 years ago
- President: Loralee Tester
- Head of school: Dr. Brian Bloomfield
- Faculty: 62
- Enrollment: 594
- Average class size: 10
- Student to teacher ratio: 10:1
- Campus type: Rural
- Color: Maroon White
- Athletics: 20 interscholastic sports
- Athletics conference: Division II
- Mascot: Vikings
- Website: lyndoninstitute.org

Lyndon Institute is a coeducational, nonprofit, independent, day and boarding comprehensive high school located on a 52 acres (21 ha) campus in the village of Lyndon Center, in the town of Lyndon, Vermont. It provides education for grades 9 through 12 for both local students and students resident on campus. Tuition is $45 000 for full boarders and $16,825 for day students. The current head of school is Dr. Brian Bloomfield.

== History ==
Lyndon Institute opened in 1867 as the Lyndon Literary and Biblical Institution by the Free Will Baptists. Its first academic term was in 1870. The campus served as home to the Lyndon Commercial College from 1886 and in 1910, Theodore Newton Vail, the first president of New England Telephone Company and the American Telephone and Telegraph Company (AT&T) founded the Vermont School of Agriculture on the campus. Vail served on the Board of Trustees for twenty years. As chairman, he saved the institution from financial ruin in 1912.

Elmer Darling also served as president of the Lyndon Institute's Board of Trustees. When the institute's main building was completely destroyed by fire in 1922, Darling led a successful campaign to raise funds to replace the building. He left a substantial amount of money on his death in 1931 to expand the school's endowment.

In 1923, the school was officially renamed Lyndon Institute. From 1923 to 1951, the institute provided both secondary and post-secondary educational programs to area students. In 1951, the post-secondary programs moved to the newly founded Lyndon State College.

In 2003 Lyndon Institute re-established its boarding program.

== Student body ==
The school has more than 40 domestic and international boarding students, including students from Taiwan, China, Germany, Czech Republic, Sweden, Kazakhstan, Mexico, Vietnam, Canada, Rwanda, Bahamas, Jamaica, Slovenia, Iceland, Spain, and South Korea. Domestic students are also able to attend with a five-day boarding option.

The institute is the high school for nearby small towns that pay tuition to the school for their students rather than fund a public high school. The Town of Lyndon uses the institute for its children; in turn, the institute accepts students promoted from the town's eighth grade through an application process.

There is an annual fall "fun day", spirit week, and a winter carnival.

== Academics ==
Students follow a program of studies that includes a college preparatory curriculum as well as a program of athletic activities, visual and performing arts classes and performances, and technical education courses. Every student takes at least one arts course; a third of the students take two or more such classes.

Starting in the 2014–2015 school year, Lyndon Institute expanded curricular opportunities for students with a January Term, in which students take part in a variety of in-depth, project-based learning courses for three weeks. The school defines the objective of the January Term as:

"…to allow every student to create an artifact, or final product, which reflects the acquisition of skill and knowledge in the field of study. These artifacts will be measured against predefined course requirements and objectives and could include: performances, videos, formal presentations, creation of web page resources, certification in a field, a business plan, a journal, a publication, or a product of some type."

The yearbook lists book arts and printmaking as highlights of the art program. There are also theater, dance, and music programs.

== Accreditation ==
Lyndon Institute is fully accredited by the New England Association of Schools and Colleges and is approved by the Vermont Agency of Education. It is a member of the Independent School Association of Northern New England and the Vermont Independent Schools Association.

== Campus ==
The school has three campuses: Vail, Harris, and Darling. Technical programs are located on the Vail Campus, named after Theodore Vail. The dorms, language classrooms, visual arts, and business classrooms are located on the Harris Campus, together with the softball diamond and Sanborn Hall. The main building, where all other classes are held, is located on the Darling Campus, along with the auditorium, student services and the administrative offices. The lower campus includes dormitories and classrooms. This campus also contains the football practice and the hockey fields, and the girls' and boys' soccer fields. Below the main building is the football field, circling which is the synthetic track built in 2003. The campus is named after Elmer Darling.

In 2010, the McDonald Field, a new baseball field, was built above the Darling Campus with help from the technical education teachers. It was funded by the McDonald family and replaced the use of the Lyndon State College Field.

There are six residence halls; three cottage-style dorms for girls and three larger dorms for boys. Live-in house parents oversee the activities of each. Most dorm students have single rooms.

== Athletics ==
The school's teams compete in Vermont's Division II and in the Mountain League in a variety of sports including football, basketball and baseball for boys, and field hockey, basketball and softball for girls. They have recently removed the snowboard team, ultimate frisbee team, bowling team, and tennis team. They also added a lacrosse team for both boys and girls.

Interscholastic sports include:

Fall	Winter	Spring
Cheerleading	Alpine skiing	Track and Field
Cross country running	Nordic skiing	Baseball
Field hockey	Ice Hockey	Softball
Football	Basketball	Lacrosse
Soccer	Cheerleading	
Mountain biking	Indoor Track	
Volleyball		
Golf		

=== St. Johnsbury / Lyndon Institute football game ===
Lyndon Institute and St. Johnsbury Academy have played football against each other since the fall of 1894, making this one of the oldest football rivalries in the nation. There have been 114 annual contests between the schools. There have been six ties and Lyndon Institute has 44 wins to St. Johnsbury Academy's 64.

== Notable alumni ==
- Walter H. Cleary, Chief Justice of the Vermont Supreme Court
- Berthold C. Coburn, member of the Vermont House of Representatives, Democratic nominee for governor in 1946
- Andrew Johnson, Olympic Nordic skier in Salt Lake City (2002) and Torino (2006)
- Moses Pendleton, founder of dance company MOMIX
- Judi St. Hilaire, Olympic 10,000 meter runner in Barcelona (1992)
- Charles Woodruff, US Army brigadier general

== Bibliography ==
- Lyndon Institute by Harriet Fletcher Fisher, Images of America, Arcadia Publishing, 2000 - history
