= Charles Woodruff (general) =

U.S. Army brigadier general

Charles Albert Woodruff
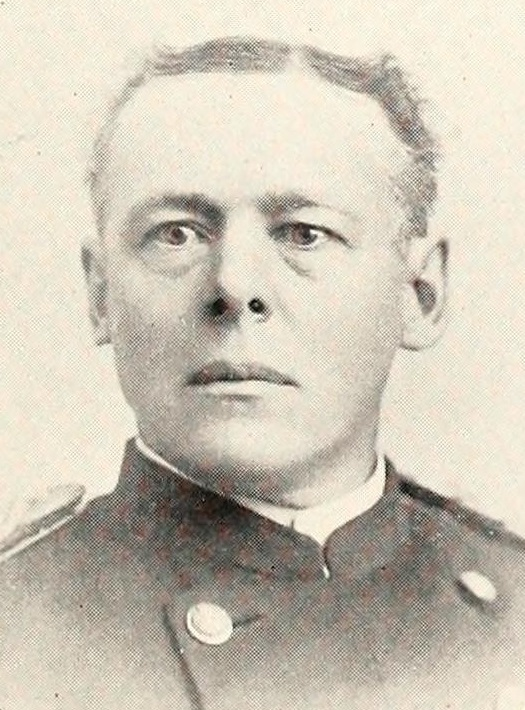
- From 1894's Officers of the Army and Navy (Regular and Volunteer) Who Served in the Civil War
- Born: April 26, 1845; Burke, Vermont, U.S.
- Died: August 13, 1920 (aged 75); Berkeley, California, U.S.
- Burial place: San Francisco National Cemetery
- Education: Bryant & Stratton Business College; United States Military Academy
- Spouse: Louise Virginia Duff (m. 1874-1920, his death)
- Children: 7
- Relatives: Malin Craig (son-in-law)
- Military career
- Allegiance: United States of America; Union
- Branch: Union Army; United States Army
- Service years: 1862–1865 (Union Army); 1867-1903 (U.S. Army)
- Rank: Brigadier General
- Units: 10th Vermont Infantry Regiment; 7th U.S. Infantry Regiment
- Conflicts: American Civil War; Battle of Cold Harbor (WIA); American Indian Wars; Sioux Wars; Nez Perce War; Battle of Big Hole; Spanish–American War; Philippine–American War
- Other work: Commandant, State Veteran's Home, Yountville, California

Charles Albert Woodruff (April 26, 1845 – August 13, 1920) was a career officer in the United States Army. A veteran of the American Civil War, American Indian Wars, Spanish–American War, and Philippine–American War, he attained the rank of brigadier general before retiring in 1903.

A native of Burke, Vermont, he attended Lyndon Institute, St. Johnsbury Academy, and Bryant & Stratton Business College in Burlington, Vermont. He enlisted for the American Civil War, joining the Union Army's 10th Vermont Infantry Regiment in 1862. He was promoted from private to corporal, was wounded at Battle of Cold Harbor in 1864, and convalesced in Vermont until being discharged at the end of the war.

In 1867, Woodruff was appointed to the United States Military Academy. He graduated in 1871, was commissioned as a second lieutenant of Infantry, and assigned to the 7th Infantry Regiment. Woodruff was assigned to frontier duty and took part in the American Indian Wars, including the Sioux Wars and Nez Perce War. He was severely wounded at the Battle of Big Hole in 1877. After recovering, he transferred to the Commissary department. He continued to serve in commissary and subsistence assignments, and had high-profile staff positions in the Spanish–American War and Philippine–American War.

Woodruff was promoted to brigadier general in July 1903 and retired the following day. In retirement he was active in several business ventures and resided in San Francisco before moving to Berkeley, California. He died in Berkeley on August 13, 1920, and was buried at San Francisco National Cemetery.

== Early life ==
Woodruff was born in Burke, Vermont on April 26, 1845, the son of Erastus Woodruff and Eliza (Quimby) Woodruff. He attended the elementary schools of Burke, Lyndon Institute, and St. Johnsbury Academy. After graduating from the academy, Woodruff went on to graduate from Bryant & Stratton Business College in Burlington, Vermont.

== Civil War ==
Woodruff volunteered for the Union Army during the American Civil War, enlisting as a private in Company A, 10th Vermont Infantry Regiment on June 5, 1862. He was promoted to corporal June 3, 1863. Woodruff was slightly wounded three times at the Battle of Cold Harbor on June 1, 1864. He was captured after being wounded, but escaped later the same night.

On June 3, 1864, Woodruff was wounded again, this time severely. He had recently been commissioned as a second lieutenant in the 117th Infantry Regiment, United States Colored Troops, but could not accept because of his need to convalesce. He convalesced at Sloan General Hospital in Montpelier, Vermont. As a result of his wounds, Woodruff was discharged from the Army on August 18, 1865.

== Post-Civil War ==
In 1867, Woodruff passed a competitive examination to obtain appointment to the United States Military Academy at West Point, New York. Among the other applicants for the appointment was Willie H. Johnston. Woodruff graduated in 1871 ranked 11th of 41 in overall standing, and first in military discipline. He was commissioned as a second lieutenant of Infantry and assigned to the 7th Infantry Regiment.

== American Indian Wars ==
Woodruff served on frontier duty at Fort Shaw, Montana from September 1871 to January 1872. From January to May 1872 he was posted to Fort Benton, Montana. He then returned to Fort Shaw where he was posted until March 1876, including participation in expeditions to explore the area around Fort Colville, Washington from August to October 1873 and Camp Lewis, Montana from June to October 1875.

As part of the 7th Infantry, Woodruff took part in the Great Sioux War of 1876, assigned as regimental adjutant and commander of a battery that consisted of one Napoleon gun and two Gatling guns. After the Battle of the Little Bighorn, Woodruff continued to be interested in the events surrounding the fight and the personalities involved. In addition to maintaining a correspondence with other participants in the campaign with whom he discussed his experiences, he also communicated with several writers and historians who researched the subject.

In the summer of 1908, Edward S. Curtis, an ethnologist and photographer of the American Indians, walked the Little Bighorn battlefield with three Crow scouts who had served with the U.S. Army during the 1876 campaign. Woodruff accompanied them so that Curtis could have the scouts' recollections of the fight considered by an experienced army officer who had knowledge of the battle. The accounts of the Crow scouts differed from the widely accepted version of events, placing more blame on George Armstrong Custer for the defeat that led to the deaths of Custer and most of his command. Curtis and Woodruff both thought the scouts were accurate, but Curtis decided the scouts' version of events was too controversial to publicize. As a result, Curtis left the account of the Crow scouts out of the volume of Sioux history he published later that year.

Woodruff served as regimental adjutant during the Nez Perce War of 1877. On August 9, he was wounded three times at the Battle of Big Hole. After being treated locally until October, Woodruff took convalescent leave, and he remained in this status until May 1878. Woodruff was promoted to first lieutenant to rank from August 9, 1877.

After recovering from his wounds, Woodruff transferred to the Army's Commissary department. He received promotion to commissary captain to date from March 28, 1877, and served in the Washington, D.C. office of the Commissary General from June to August 1878. He was assigned as chief commissary and acting assistant adjutant of the Department of the Missouri at Fort Leavenworth, Kansas from August 22, 1878, to October 9, 1879. He was chief commissary of subsistence for the District of New Mexico and the post at Fort Marcy, New Mexico until October 31, 1884, and also served as acting assistant adjutant and acting engineer officer.

From November 1884 to May 1889, Woodruff served as chief commissary of the Department of the Columbia at Vancouver Barracks, Washington and performed several temporary staff assignments, including assistant adjutant, judge advocate, ordnance officer, and signal officer. While with the Department of the Columbia, Woodruff was part of the Army contingent that took part in responding to the Seattle riot of 1886.

== Later career ==
Woodruff was purchasing and depot commissary of subsistence for the Department of California in San Francisco from August 1889 to April 1894. In 1890 he received a promotion to captain by brevet to recognize his heroism at the Battle of Big Hole. In 1891, he delivered a speech during events commemorating the twenty-fifth anniversary of the founding of the Grand Army of the Republic. It was so well received that afterward, the GAR's George H. Thomas Post Number 2 in San Francisco paid to print and distribute 10,000 copies. In December 1892, he was promoted to temporary commissary major.

In April 1894, Woodruff was assigned as assistant to the Commissary General of Subsistence in Washington, D. C., and he served until May 1896. He was then assigned as chief commissary for the Department of the East at Governors Island, New York. In February 1898, Woodruff was promoted to commissary lieutenant colonel, and in May he received promotion to commissary colonel.

During the Spanish–American War, Woodruff was purchasing and depot commissary in New York City from May to December 1898. In December, he took charge of the Subsistence Branch of the Army Transport Service. He was assigned to inspect subsistence operations in Cuba from February to March 1899, after which he was assigned to inspect subsistence operations in San Francisco.

Woodruff was assigned from July 1900 to August 1902 as chief commissary for the Military Division of the Pacific in Manila, Philippines during the Philippine–American War. He served as chief commissary for the Department of California from September 1902 to July 1903. He was simultaneously superintendent of the Subsistence Branch of the Army Transport Service in San Francisco (October 1902 to July 1903) and purchasing and depot commissary for the depot in San Francisco (October 1902 to July 1903).

On July 27, 1903, Woodruff was promoted to brigadier general. On July 28, he retired from military service.

== Later work ==
From December 1904 to May 1905, Woodruff worked in Nicaragua as director of the Nicaragua Finance and Improvement Company, a company created to construct electricity plants and railroads in the Central American country. In 1905, he was a member of San Francisco's Fusion Campaign Committee, a coalition of Republicans and Democrats that sought to overthrow the corrupt government of Abe Ruef and his Union Labor Party. Woodruff also served as a director of San Francisco's State Savings and Commercial Bank and in 1906 was appointed to the Board of Visitors of the United States Naval Academy. He was also active in veterans' organizations, including the Military Order of the Loyal Legion of the United States, Grand Army of the Republic, and United Spanish War Veterans.

From 1909 to 1914, Woodruff was commandant of the state veteran's home in Yountville, California. After retiring as commandant, he was a resident of Berkeley, California. In the years prior to World War I and during the war, Woodruff engaged in high-profile activities to support the U.S. war effort, including leadership roles with the local American Red Cross and the American Protective League.

== Death ==
Woodruff died in Berkeley, California on August 12, 1920. Organizations providing honors at his funeral included the Grand Army of the Republic, National Indian Wars Veterans, United Spanish War Veterans, American Legion, and United Veterans of the Republic. He was buried at San Francisco National Cemetery.

== Family ==
In 1874, Woodruff married Louise Virginia Duff (1854-1942). They were the parents of three sons and three daughters:

- Mary (1875-1876)
- James (1877-1969), U.S. Army major general
- Edith (1878-1970), the wife of Roger Williams of Berkeley, California
- Genevieve (1880-1941), the wife of General Malin Craig
- Charles (1884-1945), a United States Navy officer who retired as a commander and joined the Canadian military for World War I. He later became a merchant ship captain, and committed suicide in Brooklyn, New York.
- Edwin (1885-1970), a World War I veteran who attained the rank of major and later pursued a financial services career in California
- Virginia (1890-1901)
