= Elizabeth Rowell Thompson =

American philanthropist

- Born: 1821; Lyndon, Vermont
- Died: 1899 (aged 77–78); Littleton, New Hampshire
- Known for: Philanthropy

Elizabeth Rowell Thompson (1821 – 1899) was an American philanthropist.

== Biography ==
Thompson was born in Lyndon, Vermont on February 21, 1821 to Samuel Rowell and Mary Atwood. Her paternal grandmother was Hannah Duston. Born to a farming family, Thompson left school and worked from aged nine as a maid of all work for twenty five cents a week. She met the older millionaire Thomas Thompson during a visit, either of his to Lyndon, or hers to Boston in 1843, and they married in January 1844. Her husband was an art collector and most of Thompson's philanthropic work didn't begin in earnest until after his death. The couple had by then moved to New York City.

Thompson used her new influence and finance to engage in the Temperance movement, Women's suffrage and charities. It is thought her greatest contributions were to the sciences which she supported, becoming the first patron to the American Association for the Advancement of Science. Thompson also gave the money for an astronomical observatory to Vassar College as well as funding research into Yellow fever. She gave funding to the Women's Free Medical College in New York City. Thompson also funded several experimental cooperative, self-supporting community colonies including the Chicago-Colorado Colony of Longmont, Colorado in 1871 and the Thompson Colony in Salina, Kansas.

Thompson's husband died on 28 March 1869 and the couple had no children. Thompson herself suffered partial paralysis after a stroke in 1890 and died in Littleton, New Hampshire in 1899.
