= Lyndon, Vermont =

- Town
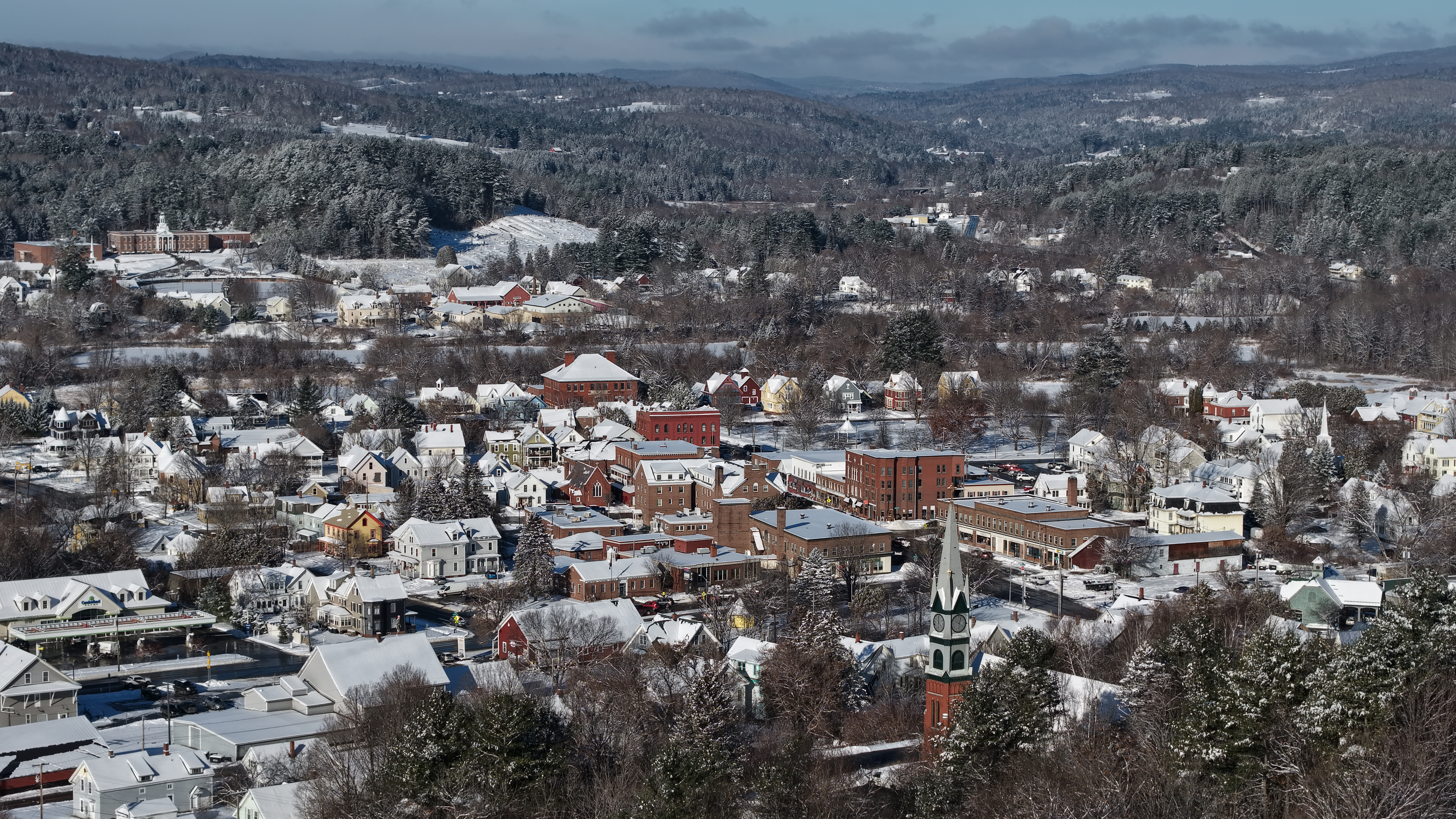
- View of Lyndon, VT, from the southeast

- Seal

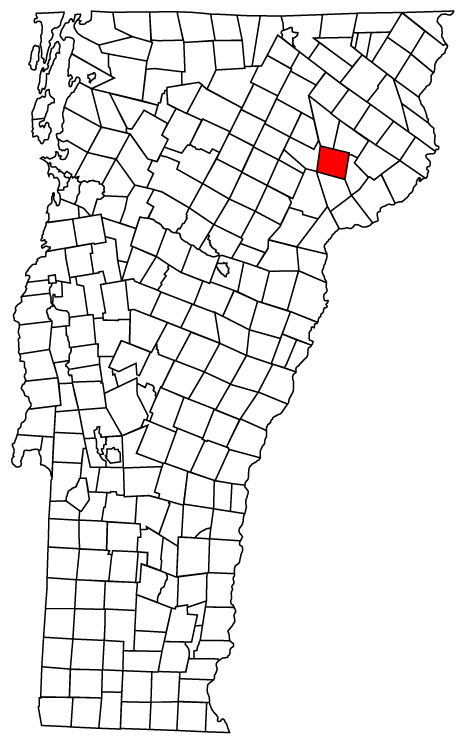
- Lyndon, Vermont
- Coordinates: 44°31′39″N 71°59′40″W
- Country: United States
- State: Vermont
- County: Caledonia
- Communities: Lyndon Center; Lyndonville; East Lyndon; Little Egypt; Lyndon Corner

Area
  - Total: 39.8 sq mi (103.1 km^{2})
  - Land: 39.5 sq mi (102.2 km^{2})
  - Water: 0.35 sq mi (0.9 km^{2})
- Elevation: 768 ft (234 m)

Population (2020)
  - Total: 5,491
  - Density: 139.2/sq mi (53.73/km^{2})
- Time zone: UTC-5 (Eastern (EST))
  - Summer (DST): UTC-4 (EDT)
- ZIP codes: 05849 (Lyndon); 05850 (Lyndon Center); 05851 (Lyndonville); 05832 (East Burke)
- Area code: 802
- FIPS code: 50-41725
- GNIS feature ID: 1462140
- Website: www.lyndonvt.org

Lyndon is a town in Caledonia County, Vermont, United States. As of the 2020 census, the population was 5,491. Lyndon is the home of one of the campuses of Vermont State University. The town contains five unincorporated villages, Lyndonville just east of the geographic center of town, Lyndon Corner in the south, Lyndon Center in the center of town on the west side of Lyndonville, Little Egypt in the north, and East Lyndon in the southeast.

Lyndon is the second-most populous town in the Northeast Kingdom; only neighboring St. Johnsbury is larger. It was also the fastest growing town in Vermont with a population over 5,000, growing 9.8% in the decade preceding the 2010 census.

== History ==
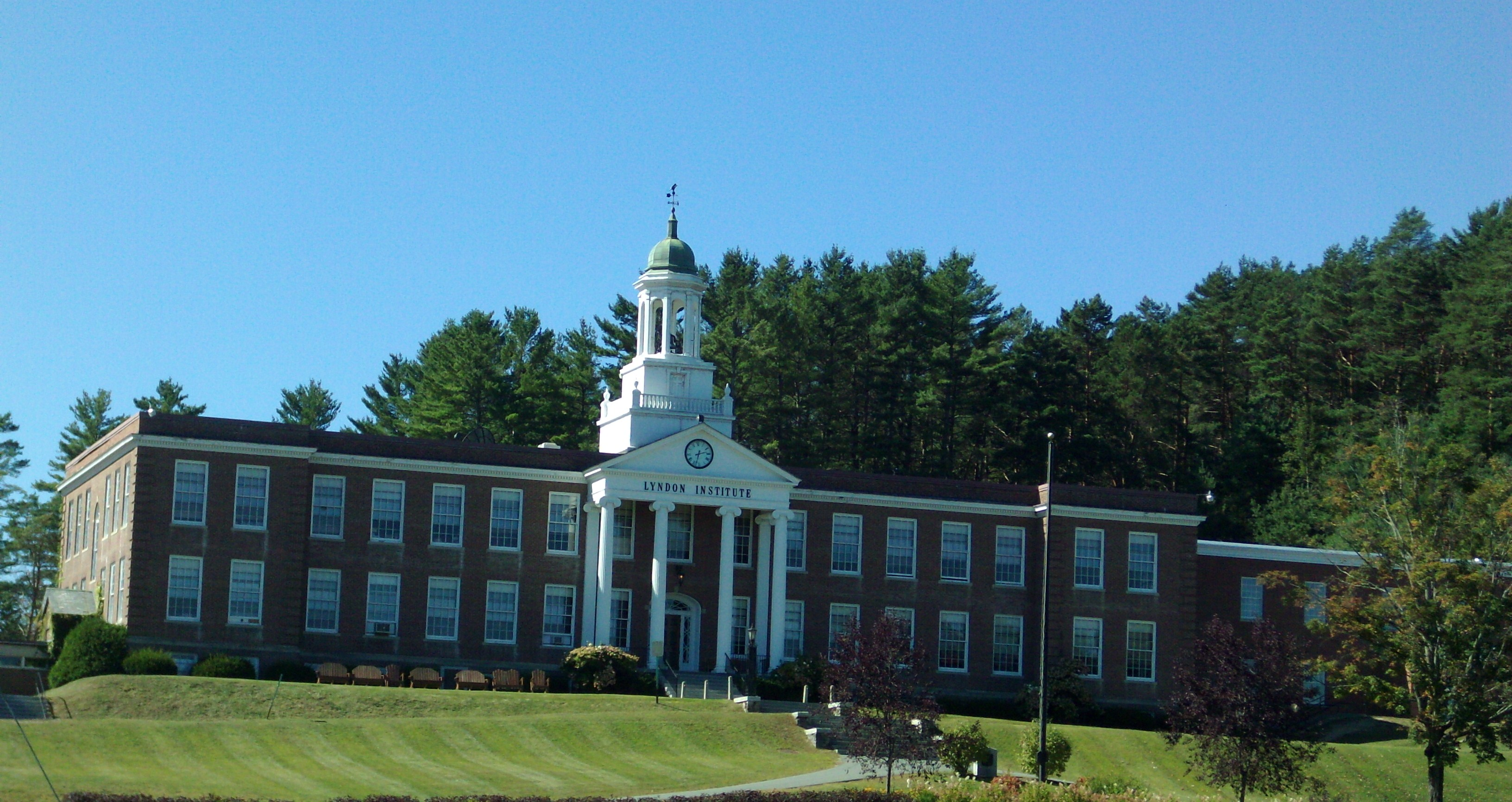
Lyndon Institute in Lyndon Center

When Rhode Island proprietors secured the original Lyndon township grant, the area was covered in forests and woodlands. The Passumpsic River, flowing through the center of the town, provided power for grist and saw mills. The charter of the town of Lyndon was signed by Governor Thomas Chittenden in 1780.

It seems likely that the name Lyndon was chosen to honor Josias Lyndon (1704–1778), a former governor of Rhode Island and friend of many of the proprietors. Many of these men served with the 2nd Rhode Island Regiment, 1st Division, including Israel Angell. The original proprietors secured the grant as a business venture and had no intention of settling it. Some of the men held high positions of rank, including Jonathan Arnold, William Greene, and James Manning, the President of Rhode Island College, later Brown University. They needed men in search of free land, who would clear each proprietor's grant in return for a portion of it. The town was surveyed in 1781 by Jonathan Arnold, Daniel Cahoon and Daniel Owen. Settlement began in 1789. By the 1790 census, twelve families with 59 residents made their homes in Lyndon. These families installed roads, mills, homes, barns, fields, crops, churches, and schools.

The village of Lyndon Corner was incorporated in 1792; Lyndon Center in 1794. Lyndonville was incorporated in 1866. The village of Lyndon Corner was about 2 miles (3 km) south of Lyndonville. The Hotel Lyndon was built there in 1807. It became a tavern and burned in 1897. About 1867, the Connecticut & Passumpsic Rivers Railroad bypassed Lyndon Corner and Lyndon Center. This resulted in business moving to Lyndonville. The bypassed villages became residential and are no longer distinguished by a separate name. They both gave up their incorporated village status in 1962.

Meetings held in Lyndon in the late 1880s by local resident Theodore Newton Vail led to the creation of American Telephone & Telegraph. In addition to other contributions to Lyndon, Vail constructed Vermont's first paved road from the railroad depot to his estate.

During a centennial celebration in 1891 an iron box was buried as a time capsule but could not be found during a 1991 ceremony.

The Lyndon Outing Club held an annual winter festival in the late 1930 to early 1940s. The festival consisted of dog sled races, cross-country and ski jumping competitions, and sulky races on cleared streets.

== Geography ==
Lyndon is located in the valley of the Passumpsic River in northeastern Vermont. It is bordered by the town of St. Johnsbury to the south, Danville to the southwest, Wheelock to the west, Sutton to the north, Burke to the northeast, and Kirby to the east. According to the United States Census Bureau, the town has a total area of 39.8 square miles (103 km^{2}), of which 39.5 square miles (102.2 km^{2}) is land and 0.35 square miles (0.9 km^{2}), or 0.89%, is water.

The highest point in Lyndon is Diamond Hill in the southwest, with an elevation of slightly greater than 1,640 feet (500 m).

=== Geology ===
Lyndonville, the main village in town, is partially located on a high kame terrace. This may have once extended across the valley to form the end of a basin. Its lower strata are clayey, and are folded and curved. West of this terrace the level is lower. There is the course of a former river bed which ran towards the east. At the upper village of Lyndon the first terrace is about 1 mile (1.6 km) wide. There is a lot of sand and fine gravel adjoining.

Every stream from either side of the valley has its large terraces to correspond with those of the Passumpsic River. It is a characteristic of these terraces that they are large while their quantity is small. The count never exceeds five which is unusual.

== Demographics ==
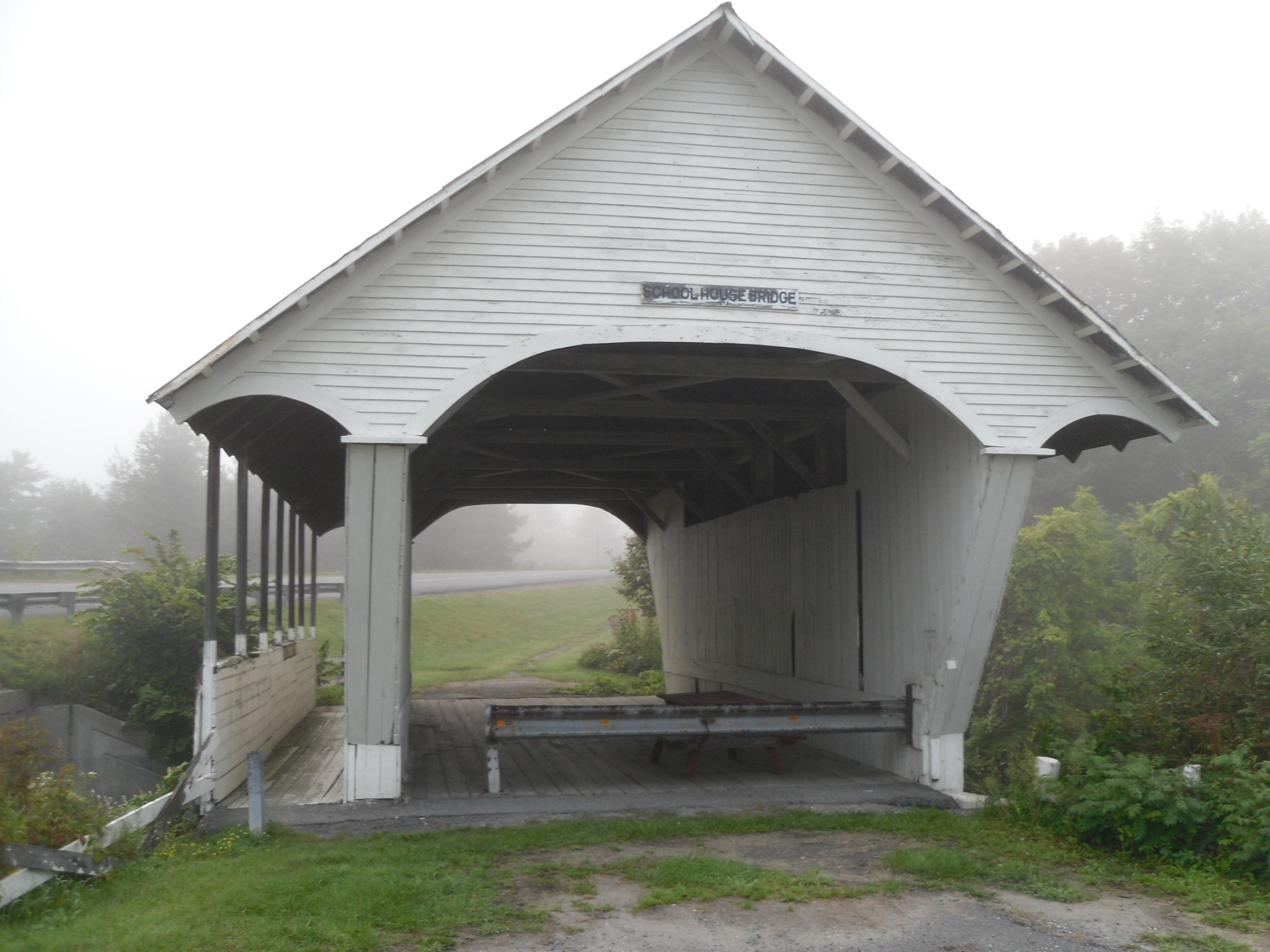
Schoolhouse Covered Bridge in Lyndon

Historical population
Census	Pop.	Note	%±
1790	59		—
1800	542		818.6%
1810	1,090		101.1%
1820	1,296		18.9%
1830	1,822		40.6%
1840	1,753		−3.8%
1850	1,752		−0.1%
1860	1,695		−3.3%
1870	2,179		28.6%
1880	2,434		11.7%
1890	2,619		7.6%
1900	2,956		12.9%
1910	3,204		8.4%
1920	3,558		11.0%
1930	3,285		−7.7%
1940	3,144		−4.3%
1950	3,360		6.9%
1960	3,425		1.9%
1970	3,705		8.2%
1980	4,924		32.9%
1990	5,371		9.1%
2000	5,448		1.4%
2010	5,981		9.8%
2020	5,491		−8.2%
U.S. Decennial Census

As of the census of 2000, there were 5,448 people, 2,031 households, and 1,326 families residing in the town. The population density was 137.0 people per square mile (52.9/km^{2}). There were 2,190 housing units at an average density of 55.1 per square mile (21.3/km^{2}). The racial makeup of the town was 97.76% White, 0.26% African American, 0.50% Native American, 0.62% Asian, 0.02% Pacific Islander, 0.17% from other races, and 0.68% from two or more races. Hispanic or Latino of any race were 0.44% of the population.

There were 2,031 households, out of which 31.6% had children under the age of 18 living with them, 50.2% were couples living together and joined in either marriage or civil union, 11.5% had a female householder with no husband present, and 34.7% were non-families. 27.0% of all households were made up of individuals, and 12.4% had someone living alone who was 65 years of age or older. The average household size was 2.43 and the average family size was 2.94.

In the town, the population was spread out, with 23.1% under the age of 18, 17.0% from 18 to 24, 24.0% from 25 to 44, 22.2% from 45 to 64, and 13.7% who were 65 years of age or older. The median age was 35 years. For every 100 females, there were 100.1 males. For every 100 females age 18 and over, there were 96.1 males. This town contains the dormitories of Vermont State University's Lyndon campus, thus affecting the age profile of the town.

The median income for a household in the town was $32,946, and the median income for a family was $42,633. Males had a median income of $30,525 versus $23,237 for females. The per capita income for the town was $16,245. About 7.3% of families and 12.1% of the population were below the poverty line, including 15.8% of those under age 18 and 7.4% of those age 65 or over.

== Government ==
The Lyndon Town Clerk is Dawn R. Dwyer, and the Selectboard members are Dan Daley III, Christian Thompson, and Fred Gorham.

=== Fire department ===
In 2014 the town had a part-time chief and 25 on-call firefighters.

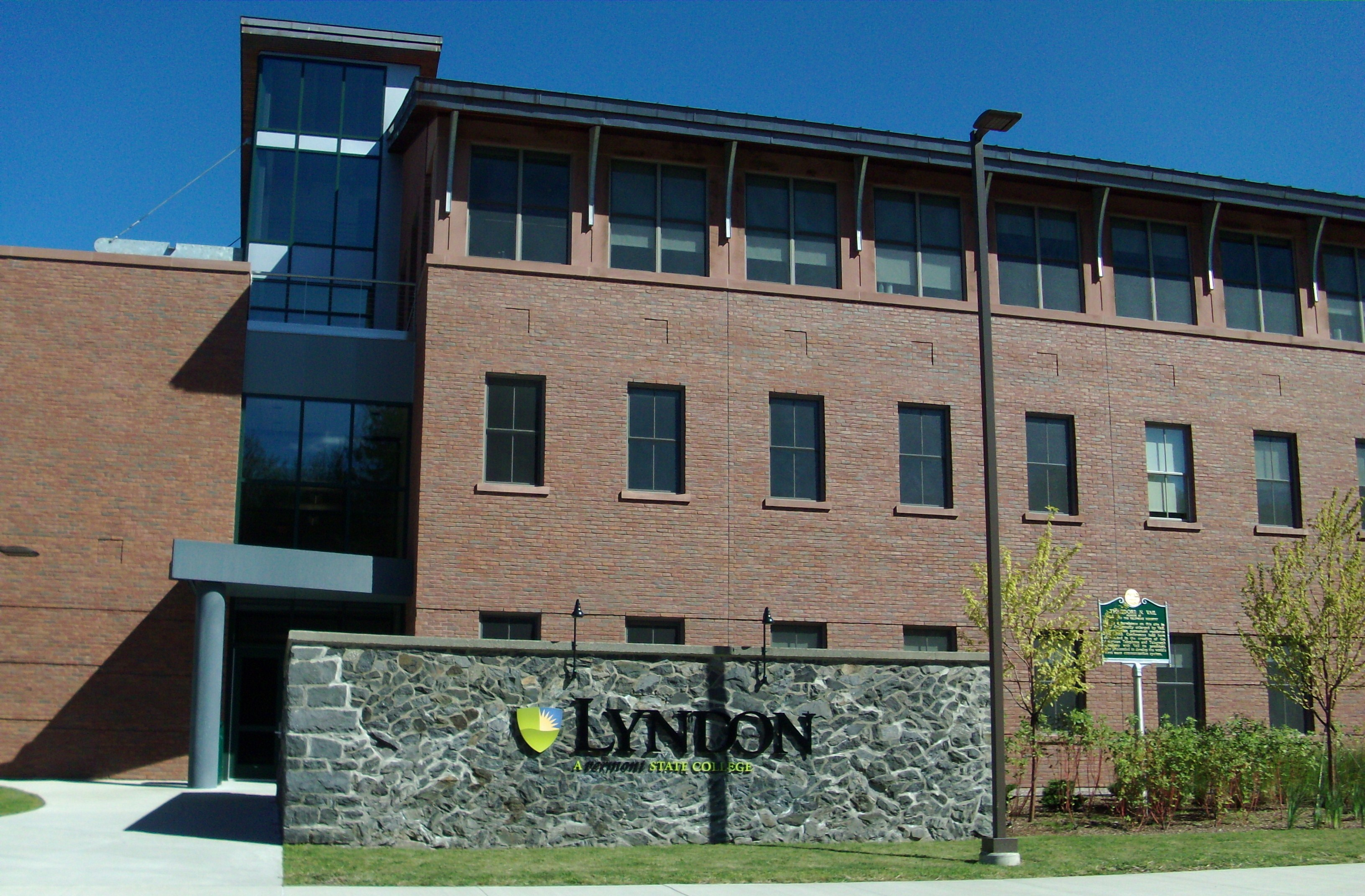
Lyndon State College

== Education ==
- Lyndon Town School – public elementary school
- Thaddeus Stevens School (private). Moved to Lyndon from Peacham in 2012
- Lyndon Institute – private high school
- Vermont State University – Lyndon – a public university, part of the Vermont State Colleges System (formerly Lyndon State College and briefly known as Northern Vermont University)

== Infrastructure ==
Interstate 91 and U.S. Route 5 both pass through Lyndon from north to south. I-91 has two exits within town. Vermont Route 114 meets U.S. 5 in the village of Lyndonville and runs to the northeast.

== Notable people ==
- Nicholas Baylies, Justice of the Vermont Supreme Court
- Elizabeth Rowell Thompson, an American philanthropist
- Theodore Newton Vail, telephone industrialist
