= Charles Armijo Woodruff =

US Navy officer and governor of American Samoa

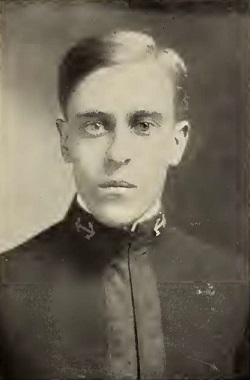
- At Annapolis in 1906

Governor of American Samoa
- In office December 6, 1914 – March 1, 1915
- Preceded by: Nathan Post
- Succeeded by: John Martin Poyer

Personal details
- Born: January 12, 1884 Santa Fe, New Mexico
- Died: November 23, 1945 (aged 61) Hotel Bossert, Brooklyn, New York City
- Education: United States Naval Academy
- Occupation: Ship captain

Military service
- Allegiance: United States
- Branch/service: United States Navy
- Rank: Commander
- Commands: USS Pampanga (PG-39)

Charles Armijo Woodruff (January 12, 1884 – November 23, 1945) was a United States Navy officer and the governor of American Samoa from December 6, 1914, to March 1, 1915. He captained multiple ships in both the Navy and the United States Merchant Marine. He served only briefly as governor, for a few months before ceding the office to John Martin Poyer.

== Life ==
Woodruff was born on January 12, 1884, in Santa Fe, New Mexico, the son of Charles Woodruff and Louise (Duff) Woodruff. After leaving the United States Navy, Woodruff became a part of the United States Merchant Marine, captaining a ship. On November 23, 1945, Woodruff died by suicide by hanging in an apartment in Hotel Bossert, Brooklyn, New York City, using the venetian blinds cord in his room. A suicide note claimed he had killed himself because he had no means of making money and "missed his boat", and that suicide provided the "easiest way out".

== Naval career ==
Woodruff was appointed to the United States Naval Academy from Pennsylvania on September 24, 1902. In 1906, he commanded the USS Pampanga (PG-39) as a Lieutenant (junior grade). Woodruff retired from the Navy with the rank of Commander.

== Governorship ==
Woodruff relieved Nathan Post of the governor's office on December 6, 1914, serving until March 1, 1915.
