= John Martin Poyer =

US Navy officer and Governor of American Samoa

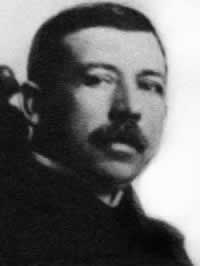

Governor of American Samoa
- In office March 1, 1915 – June 10, 1919
- Preceded by: Charles Armijo Woodruff
- Succeeded by: Warren Jay Terhune

Personal details
- Born: 1861 Indiana, U.S.
- Died: May 12, 1922 (aged 60–61) Washington, D.C.
- Resting place: Arlington National Cemetery
- Spouse: Emma Porter
- Education: United States Naval Academy
- Occupation: Naval officer

Military service
- Allegiance: United States
- Branch/service: United States Navy
- Years of service: 1879–1906, 1915–1919
- Rank: Commander
- Awards: Navy Cross

John Martin Poyer (1861 – May 12, 1922) was the Naval Governor of American Samoa, from March 1, 1915, to June 10, 1919. He held the longest term of any American governor appointed over the territory by the United States Government. A Naval Academy graduate, Poyer served in numerous positions and retired in 1906 on account of failing health; however, the navy recalled him to service in 1915 to serve as governor. During the 1918 flu pandemic, Poyer quarantined the territory to stop the spread of the pandemic to American Samoa. Because of his actions, no deaths occurred in American Samoa, and he received the Navy Cross. Upon his final retirement, Poyer had reached the rank of commander.

Poyer served as Governor of American Samoa during World War I. While the territory was not directly involved in the war, Poyer focused on enhancing the education and public health systems. In his honor, a Junior High School was named after him. He arrived in American Samoa shortly after a devastating hurricane that destroyed much of the development in the Manuʻa Islands. In 1915, Poyer evacuated over 50% of Manua's population to Tutuila to await the harvest of new crops, which resulted in many residents choosing to remain in Tutuila, significantly reducing Manua's population. In 1918, a deadly influenza epidemic struck Western Samoa, killing one-fifth of the population on both Upolu and Savaiʻi. Governor Poyer implemented a strict quarantine on all incoming items from Western Samoa, with mail being delivered well outside the Pago Pago Harbor. This decisive action resulted in zero influenza casualties in American Samoa. Poyer was highly popular, and the Samoan people overwhelmingly wanted him to remain in office when his term ended.

== Life and career ==
=== Early life ===
Poyer was born in Indiana in 1861. He was appointed to the United States Naval Academy from Wisconsin in October 1879.

=== Naval career ===
Poyer became an ensign in February 1884, a lieutenant (junior grade) in December 1894. He was stationed to the Washington Navy Yard from 1892 to 1894, the USS Montgomery from August 1894 to 1897, the Naval War College in June 1897, back to the Washington Ship Yard from 1897 to 1898, and the USS Saint Paul. He became a lieutenant in May 1898. Poyer retired from active duty on June 30, 1906, on account of ill-health as a lieutenant commander, but was brought back to active duty to become Governor of American Samoa.

== Governorship ==
On March 1, 1915, Poyer relieved Lieutenant Charles Armijo Woodruff and became the twelfth Governor of American Samoa, the eleventh man to hold the office. He is one of only three men to hold the office of naval governor after having already retired from the navy. As governor, Poyer ended prohibition of alcohol in the territory. During the 1918 flu pandemic, Poyer quarantined American Samoa after hearing news reports of worldwide deaths on the radio. This action caused American Samoa to be one of the few places in the world to not suffer any flu deaths. Angered by the quarantine of ships, Lieutenant Colonel Robert Logan of the New Zealand Army, administrator of Western Samoa, cut off communications with American Samoa. For his leadership in preventing the spread of Spanish influenza, Poyer received the Navy Cross.

Poyer transferred command of American Samoa to Warren Jay Terhune on June 10, 1919, ending his governorship. His term is the longest of any naval governor of American Samoa. After his retirement, Poyer lived in Washington, D.C. until his death. He was buried at Arlington National Cemetery.

Poyer, the longest-serving naval governor of American Sāmoa, is perhaps best remembered for founding the New Government High School in 1918 at Anua (later named the Poyer School). Built at a cost of US$25,000, it operated for nearly three decades and educated many of the territory's leading political and business figures of the mid-20th century.

=== Navy Cross Citation ===

The President of the United States of America takes pleasure in presenting the Navy Cross to Commander John Martin Poyer, United States Navy, for exceptionally meritorious service in a duty of great responsibility as Governor of American Samoa, for wise and successful administration of his office and especially for the extraordinarily successful measures by which American Samoa was kept absolutely immune from the epidemic of influenza at a time when in the neighboring islands of the Samoan group more than 10,000 deaths occurred, and when the percentage of deaths throughout the Polynesian Islands as a group, is reported to have ranged from 30 to 40 per cent of the population
