= Beach Point Capital Management =

California Hedge Fund

Beach Point Capital Management LP
- Company type: Private
- Industry: Investment management
- Predecessor: Post Advisory Group
- Founded: 2009; 17 years ago
- Founders: Carl Goldsmith; Scott Klein
- Headquarters: Santa Monica, California, U.S.
- Products: Hedge funds Alternative investments
- AUM: US$18 billion (March 2024)
- Number of employees: 157 (March 2024)
- Website: beachpoint.capital

Beach Point Capital Management (Beach Point) is an American hedge fund management firm headquartered in Santa Monica, California.The firm focuses on credit related investments.

Outside the U.S., it has offices in London and Dublin.

== Background ==
Carl Goldsmith and Scott Klein were employees of Post Advisory Group, a credit investment firm that was acquired by Principal Financial Group in 2003 and was fully owned by 2008. In early 2009, Goldsmith and Klein struck a deal to buy Post Advisory's hedge fund business from Principal and added asset management contracts. The independent business was renamed to Beach Point Capital Management and a significant number of Post Advisory's employees left to join it including its Chief investment officer.

Within a year of its founding, Beach Point became the 83rd biggest hedge fund firm in the world, ahead of Marshall Wace and Tiger Global Management.

In August 2014, real estate firm Variant Holding filed for bankruptcy protection. Beach Point which was owed more than $73 million tried to oust the management of the firm and presented to the court it had amassed evidence of "rampant fraud" by the company to "line the pockets of insiders." In 2015, a settlement was reached where the chief restructuring officer took control of the firm and Beach Point was allowed to select a third member to the board. In January 2016, Variant Holding sold more than 20 apartment buildings to Beach Point as part of the bankruptcy procedure.

Beach Point entered the Irish market via acquisition of a portfolio of loans originated by BMS Finance Ireland. The portfolio included credit advanced to Maximum Media and Irish Studio. In July 2019, it was reported that Beach Point had provided backing to the owners of the Sunday Business Post.

In May 2024, it was reported that Beach Point purchased the $112 million note on Hotel Bossert and were in talks with the Chetrit Group to reopen the hotel. In September 2024, it was reported that Beach Point acquired Metro Franchising, one of the largest franchisees of Dunkin' Donuts.
