= Hotel Bossert =

Hotel in Brooklyn, New York

Bossert
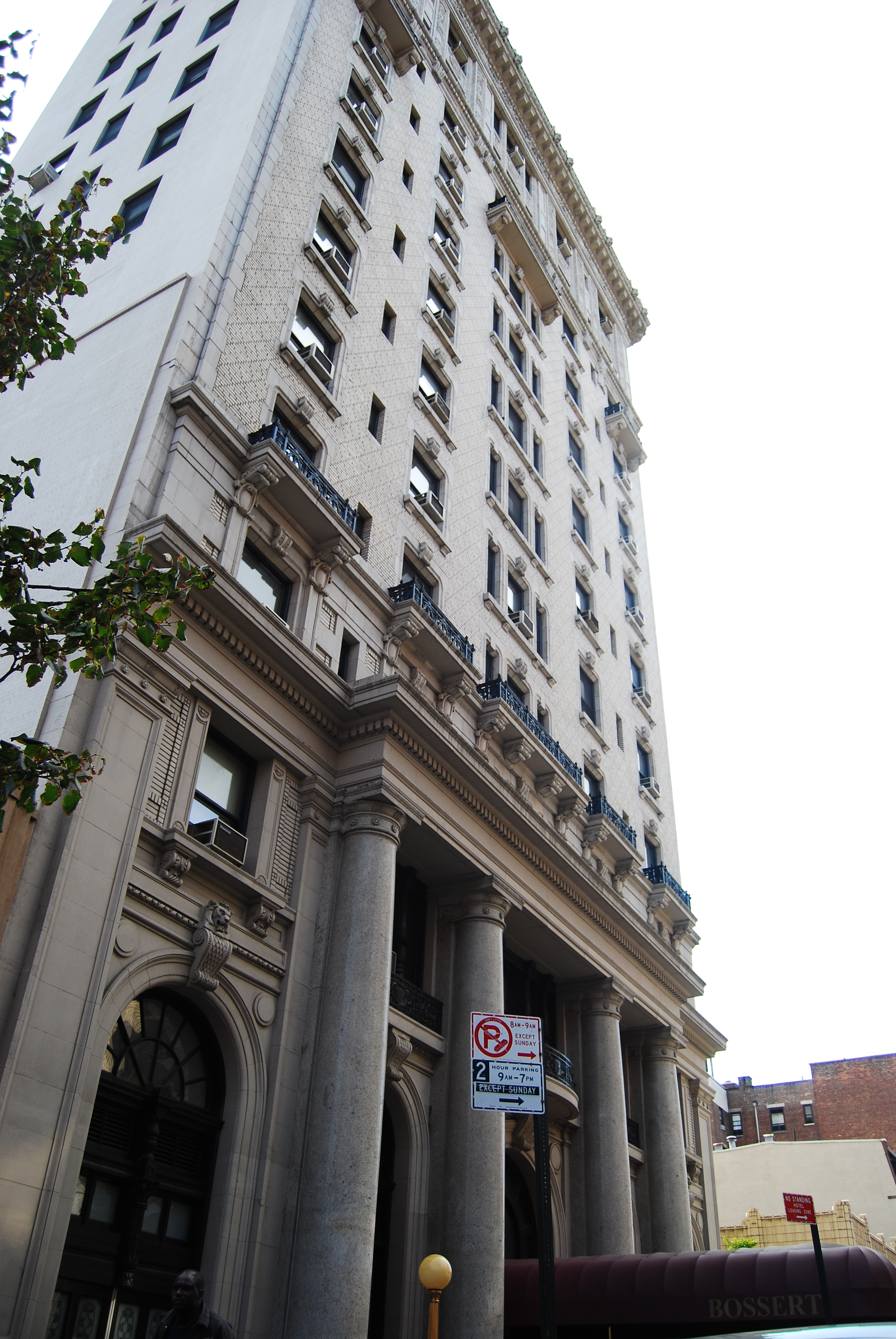
- Interactive map of the Bossert area

General information
- Location: Brooklyn, New York City, 98 Montague Street
- Coordinates: 40°41′41.5″N 73°59′45″W
- Owner: SomeraRoad

Technical details
- Floor count: 14

Design and construction
- Architects: Helmle & Huberty
- Developer: Louis Bossert

Other information
- Number of suites: 224

The Hotel Bossert is a former hotel in the Brooklyn Heights neighborhood of Brooklyn in New York City. Opened in 1909, it was bought by the Jehovah's Witnesses in 1988 and used by them until 2012, when it was sold for conversion back to a hotel. The conversion work has stalled multiple times since then and the hotel has remained vacant. It is owned by SomeraRoad, which plans to convert the building into residences, as of 2025.

The Bossert was once known as "the Waldorf-Astoria of Brooklyn". It was the site of the celebration of the Brooklyn Dodgers' only World Series championship.

== Early years ==
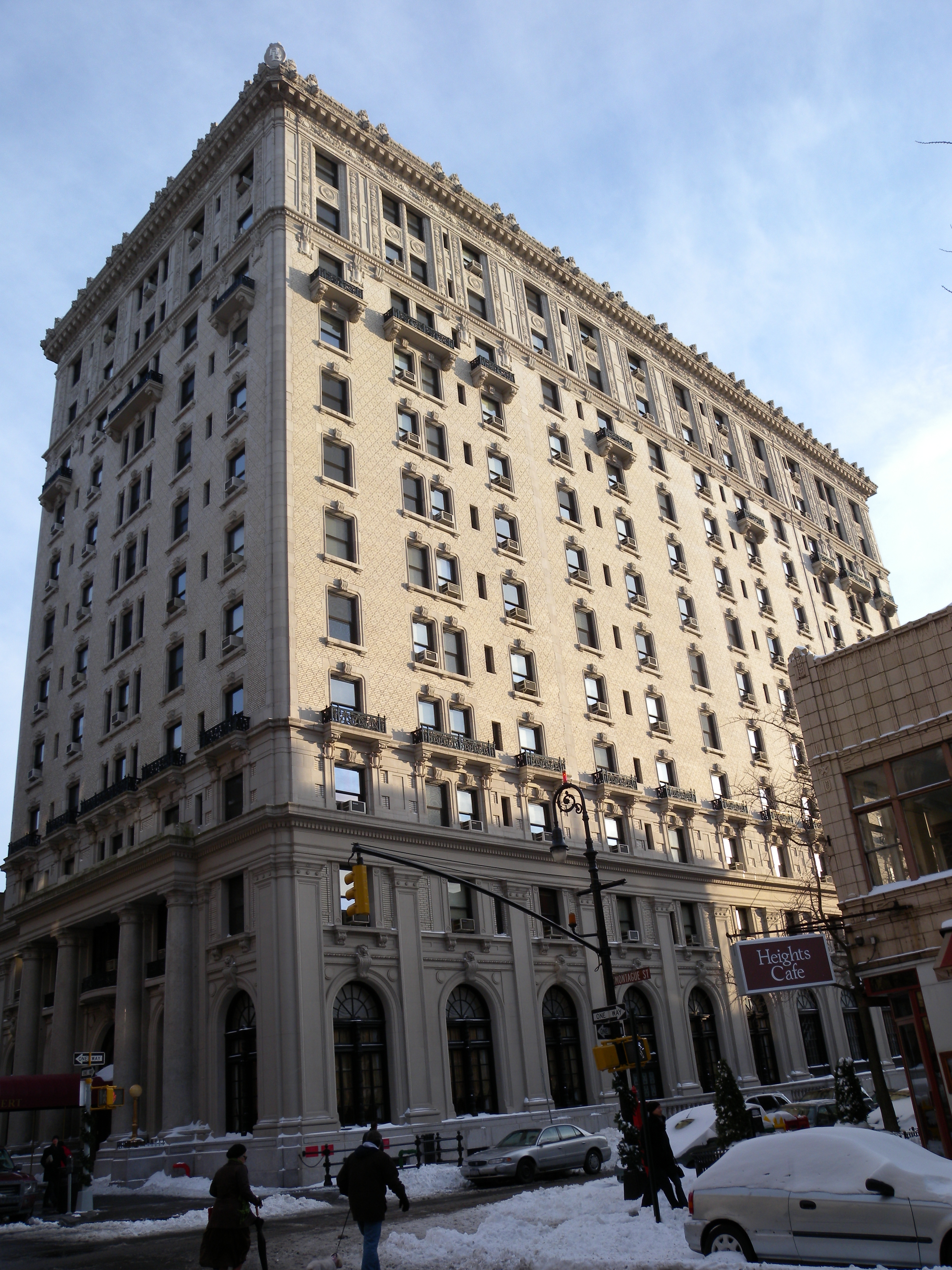

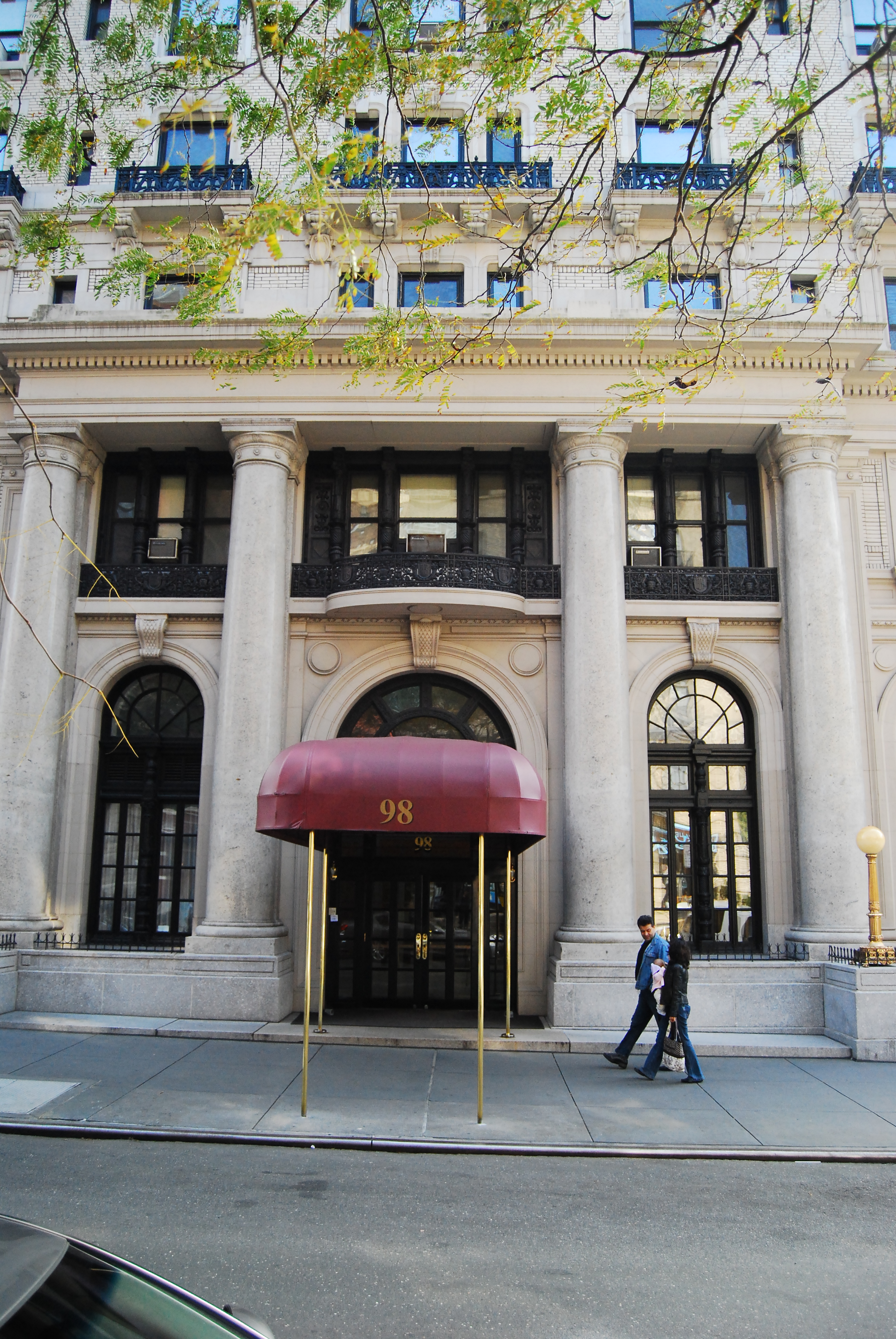
Montague Street entrance

The hotel was built in 1909 by Louis Bossert, a Brooklyn lumber magnate, at 98 Montague Street in Brooklyn Heights. It had an Italian Renaissance Revival-style exterior. It was designed as an apartment hotel and originally had 375 hotel rooms. The architects were Helmle & Huberty.

During the 1920s, the Hotel Bossert was known for its Marine Roof, a two-level restaurant on the roof of the 14-story building that provided diners with a commanding view of Manhattan. Popular bandleader Freddy Martin initially gained popularity through a lengthy stint performing at the Marine Roof in the early 1930s. Some of his earliest commercial recordings, which pioneered the 'tenor band' style of sweet dance music, were credited only as the 'Hotel Bossert Orchestra'.

The hotel drew some attention in November 1945, when Charles Armijo Woodruff, the 11th Governor of American Samoa, committed suicide by hanging himself in his room there. Just one month later, former Congressman Thomas F. Magner also died in the hotel.

In the 1950s, the Bossert was the home of several Brooklyn Dodger players. Following the Brooklyn Dodgers' win over the New York Yankees in the 1955 World Series, Dodgers fans gathered in the Bossert lobby and serenaded Dodgers' manager Walter Alston with "For He's a Jolly Good Fellow".

== Purchase by Watchtower and restoration ==
In 1983, the Watchtower Bible and Tract Society of New York began leasing space in the Bossert for use by Jehovah's Witnesses. The Society bought the hotel in 1988. It required extensive restoration according to the Landmarks Preservation Commission standards for the historic district. The famed Marine Roof had collapsed, and a new roof had to be built. Also, the lobby was in poor condition, and over 2,500 square feet (230 m^{2}) of the marble had to be replaced. Watchtower went to the original quarry to replace it. That effort garnered praise and awards.

In late January 2008, the Society announced it would sell the building. The sale was conducted through a private-bidding process, which took nearly five years. One local realtor (Arlene Waye of Awaye Realty) estimated that the building would sell for about $100 million. Judi Stanton, the president of the Brooklyn Heights Association, remarked that "The Witnesses have done an exquisite job in maintaining the building." Timothy King, a senior partner at Massey Knakal Realty Services Brooklyn, agreed calling the hotel "one of the most unique and most well-maintained trophy assets in Brooklyn." He continued, "The Watchtower organization is well known for impeccable maintenance standards and the Bossert reflects this level of care. It will be a challenge for a new owner to run the building with the same level of care and attention to detail." At the time, there were 224 apartments.

== Bistricer and Chetrit ownership ==
In August 2012, the Bossert was sold for $81 million to David Bistricer of Clipper Equity and Joseph Chetrit of the Chetrit Group. After the sale was finalized that November, the new owners planned to turn it into a boutique hotel with 302 rooms. Although Bistricer and Chetrit did begin renovating the property, multiple announced opening dates have come and gone since then. By 2019, the hotel had five residents remaining, all of whom were occupying rent-stabilized apartments. That year, Chetrit became the exclusive owner after buying out Bistricer's stake. Cantor Commercial Real Estate also lent Chetrit $112 million in 2019, and Wells Fargo took over the loan the next year.

In May 2022, it was reported that the structure faced foreclosure, after the Chetrit Group defaulted on a $112 million mortgage. In September 2022, it was reported that the vacant hotel had been foreclosed and would be auctioned. In March 2023, it was reported that the scaffolding that had covered the hotel's lower facade for two and a half years, had been removed. It was also reported that hoteliers Ian Schrager and Ed Scheetz were seeking to partner with the Chetrit Group to reopen the hotel as part of their Public Hotels chain. This plan would have involved adding 78 rooms, in addition to a bar and restaurant. At the time, the hotel had 282 rooms. Schrager and Scheetz's plan ultimately fell through.

As of February 2024, the vacant building had $177 million of debt and was scheduled to be sold at auction. Beach Point Capital Management acquired the $112 million mortgage that May. An auction for the Hotel Bossert was scheduled for February 2025, and the only bidder, Beach Point, acquired it the same month after submitting a $999,000 bid. In May 2025, SomeraRoad acquired the Bossert, paying $100 million with the intention of turning it into apartments. The plans call for 60 to 70 units, along with a high-end restaurant spanning about 5,000 square feet (460 m^{2}). Work began in July 2026, at which point the residential conversion was planned to be completed in 2028. That September, SomeraRoad and Marriott International announced that the Hotel Bossert would be rebranded as the Ritz-Carlton Residences, Brooklyn Heights.

== Notable people ==
Barbara Cooney was born in the hotel, which was built by her maternal grandfather.
