= John Frederick Parker (naval officer) =

Governor of American Samoa

John Fredrick Parker (1853 – December 1911) was an American naval officer who served governor of American Samoa from May 21, 1908 to November 10, 1910. He was a captain in the United States Navy and fought in the Spanish–American War.

== Early life and education ==
John Frederick Parker was born to Olivia Lauder Parker. Parker graduated from the United States Naval Academy in 1874. He married Elizabeth Scott Lord, the sister of President Benjamin Harrison's wife Caroline Harrison.

== Career ==
During the Spanish–American War Parker was a navigating officer on the Columbia. The training ship Prairie was commanded by Parker in 1905.

In June 1907, Parker retired from active service. Parker was selected to replace Charles Brainard Taylor Moore as governor of American Samoa in March 1908. American Samoa was referred to as Tutuila at the time. As governor, Parker recommended that the territory would officially change its name from "U.S. Naval Station Tutuila" to "American Samoa". When arguing for the change, Parker said the people of Manua were unhappy over not being included in the original name. The Navy Solicitor General accepted Parkers argument and the territory was renamed.

Upon the death of Tui Manu’a Eliasara in 1909, Governor Parker announced that since the American flag was raised in the Manuʻa Islands in 1904, the title of Tui Manu'a had been altered to District Governor. This change was implemented because the title of Tui Manu'a was considered royal, which was deemed incompatible with the United States Constitution.

== Later life ==
Parker died at his house in New York City in December 1911. On December 11, he was buried in Washington, D.C. at Rock Creek Cemetery.

== Naval Commission documents ==
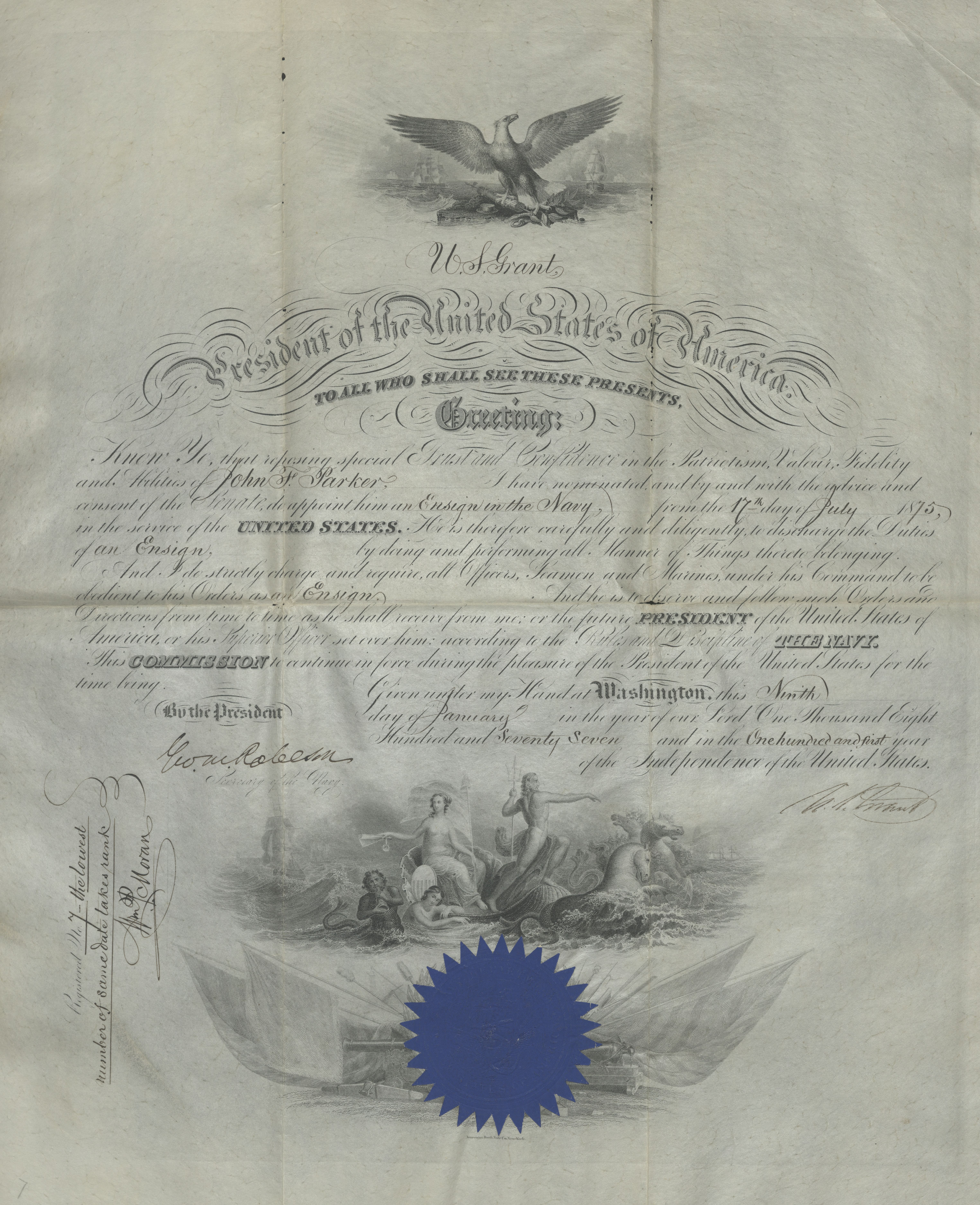
Parker's Naval Commission signed by President Grant in 1877

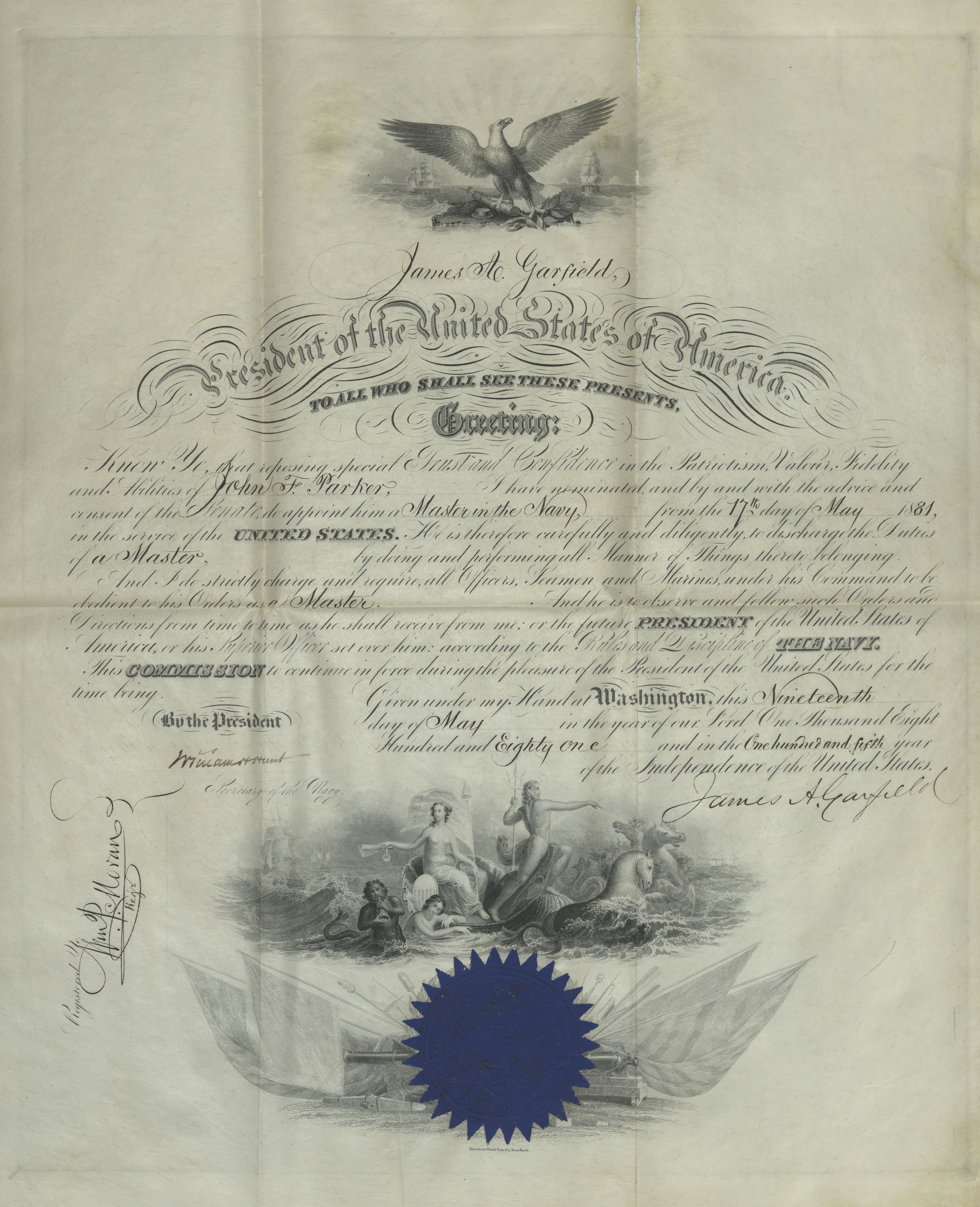
Parker's Naval Commission signed by President Garfield in 1881

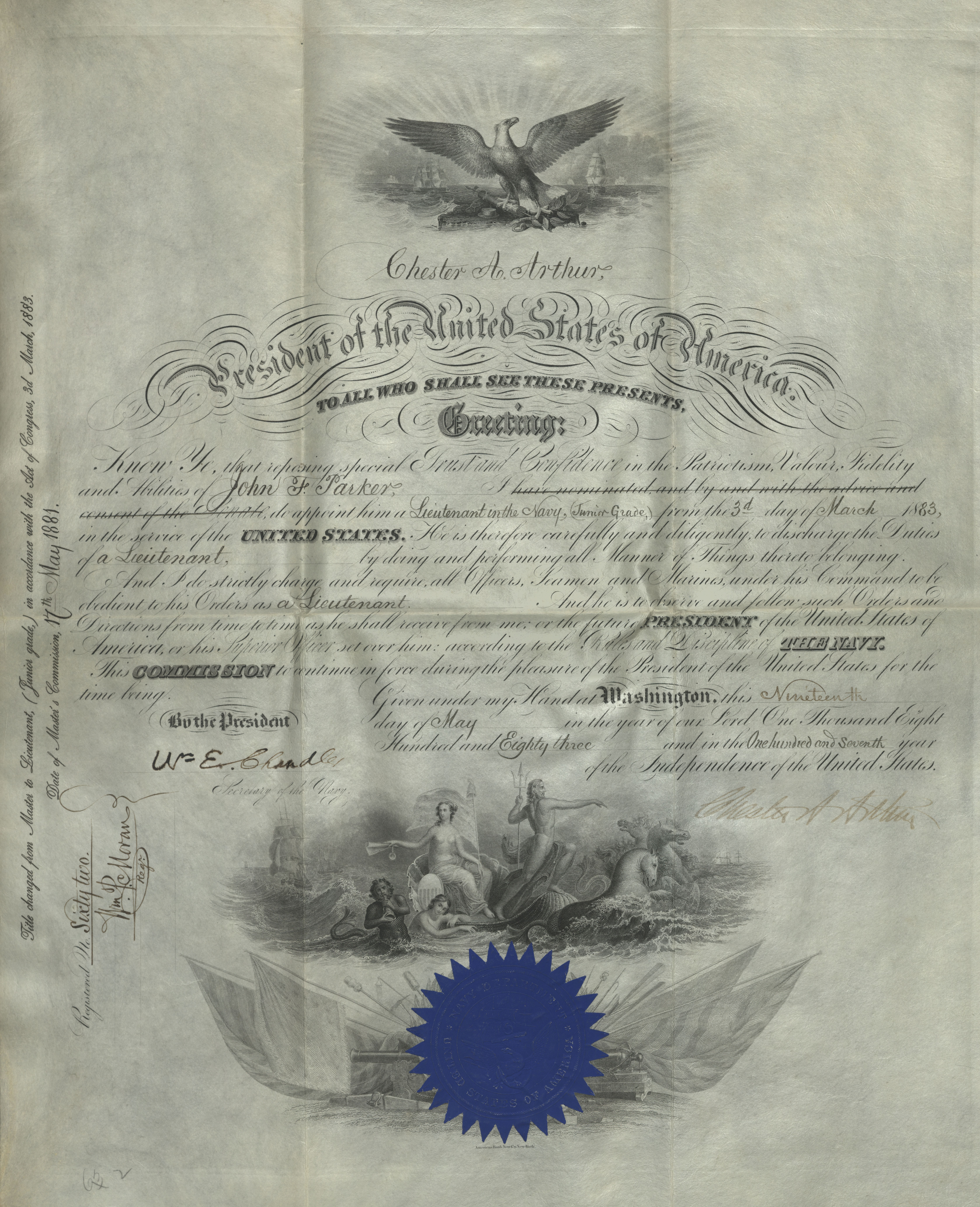
Parker's Naval Commission signed by President Arthur in 1883

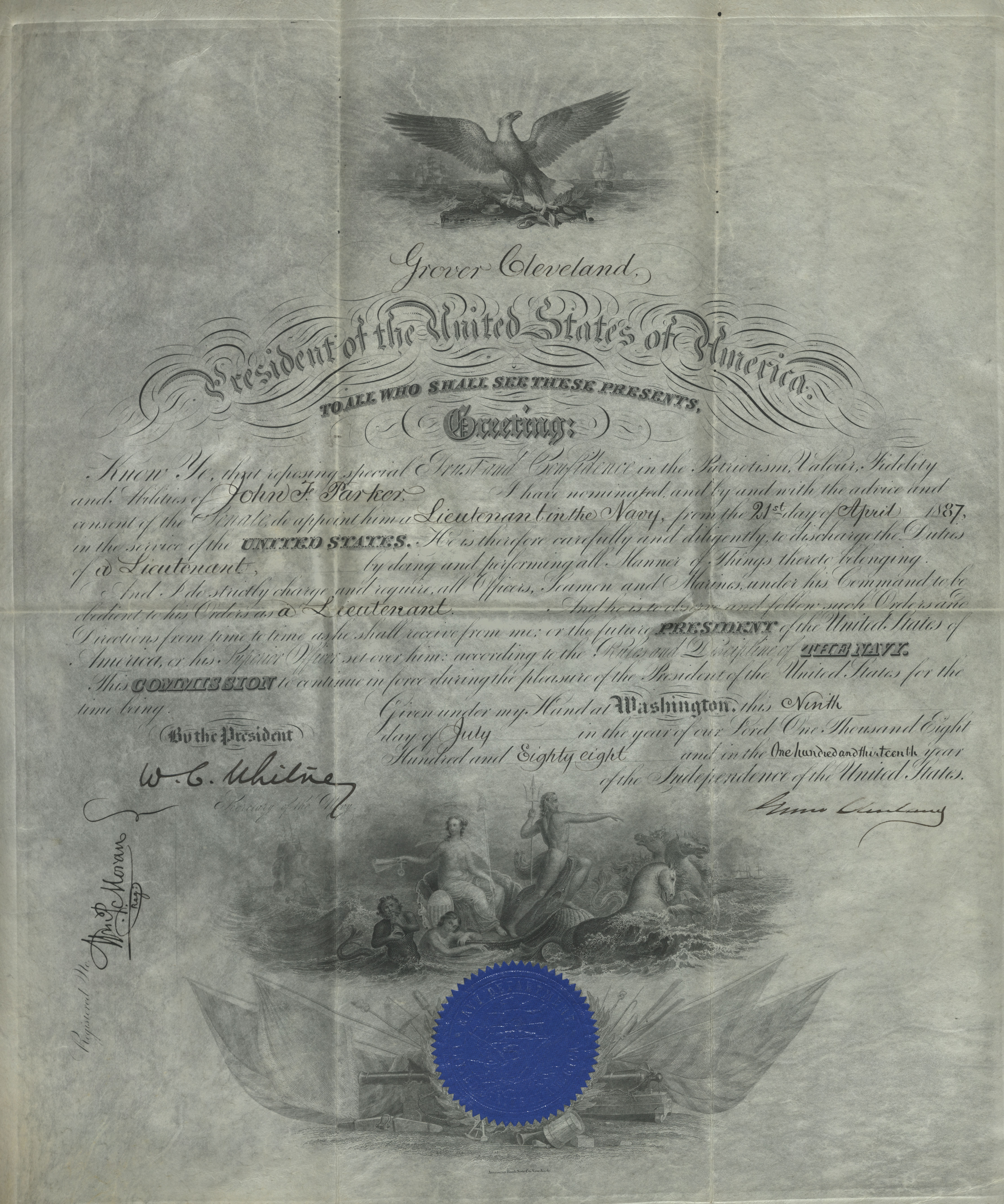
Parker's Naval Commission signed by President Cleveland in 1888

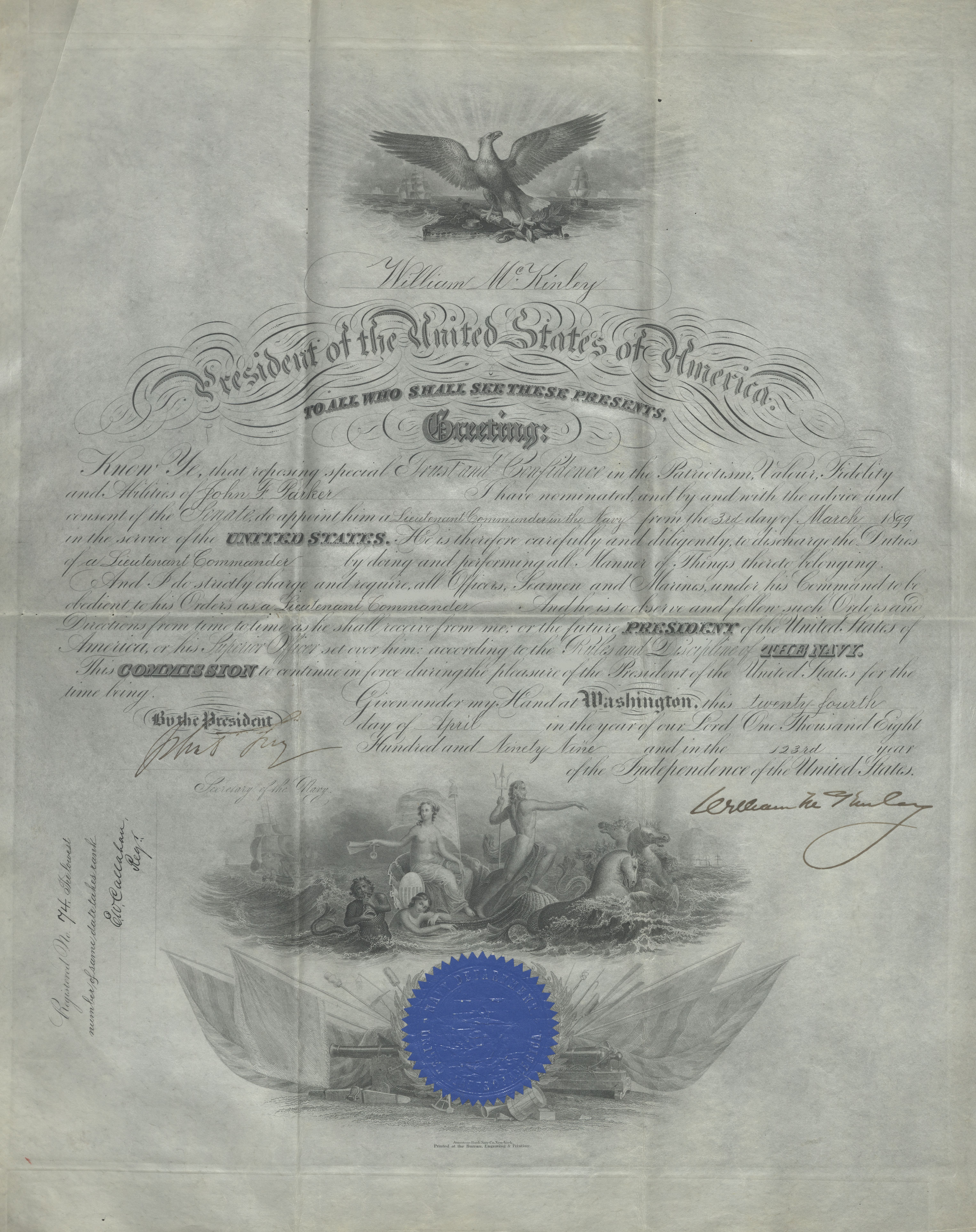
Parker's Naval Commission signed by President McKinley in 1899

== Works cited ==
- "New Commander at Tutuila". Albuquerque Journal. March 28, 1908. p. 3 – via Newspapers.com.
- "Obituary". Indianapolis Journal. December 11, 1889. p. 2 – via Newspapers.com.
- "Paralysis". The Cincinnati Enquirer. December 10, 1911. p. 5 – via Newspapers.com.
- "To Command At Tutila". The Boston Globe. March 30, 1908. p. 6 – via Newspapers.com.
