= Clark Daniel Stearns =

Naval governor of American Samoa

Governor of American Samoa
- In office July 14, 1913 – October 2, 1914
- Preceded by: Nathan Woodworth Post
- Succeeded by: Nathan Woodworth Post

Personal details
- Born: January 15, 1870 Michigan, USA
- Died: May 25, 1944 (aged 74) Miami-Dade County, Florida
- Education: United States Naval Academy
- Occupation: Naval officer
- Awards: Navy Distinguished Service Medal

Military service
- Allegiance: United States
- Branch/service: United States Navy
- Rank: Captain
- Commands: USS Roanoke; USS Michigan (BB-27)

Clark Daniel Stearns (January 15, 1870 – May 25, 1944) was the Naval Governor of American Samoa. Stearns commanded various vessels, on which he set up organized committees for the crew to give suggestions to the officers. He hoped to alleviate tensions between the enlisted men and officers. However, upon his appointment to the battleship USS Michigan (BB-27), he was removed from command of these activities.

Stearns relieved Nathan Woodworth Post as Governor of American Samoa on July 14, 1913, and helped the Samoans achieve more involvement in government. He received a medal from the Japanese Red Cross, as well as the Navy Distinguished Service Medal during his career. He retired at the rank of Captain.

== Life and career ==
Stearns was born in Big Rapids, MeCosta County, Michigan. He graduated from the United States Naval Academy in June 1893. He died on May 25, 1944, aboard a submarine chaser off Miami, Florida, of a coronary thrombosis.

=== Naval career ===
In 1918, Stearns was posted to USS Roanoke, a civilian ship converted into a minelayer, where he eventually took command. While in command, Stearns allowed the crew to form two organized committees, one for the petty officers, and another composed of one man from each enlisted division. These committees investigated questionable rulings regarding minor disciplinary actions, and to make complaints and suggestions about the "health, happiness and comfort of the ship's company." He believed that these committees would lead to less unrest on the ship, as there would be less tension between officers and enlisted sailors, and Secretary of the Navy Josephus Daniels supported the effort. During his command of Roanoke, Stearns received the Navy Distinguished Service Medal. After leaving command of Roanoke, Stearns examined the Naval Penal System, ruled it "archaic", and recommended the creation of an Office of Discipline.

Stearns commanded the battleship USS Michigan next, but was relieved of his command in 1921 after only 107 days, after allowing his sailors to form the same organized committees as he had on Roanoke. At the advent of the Warren Harding administration, admirals who had opposed Naval Secretary Josephus Daniels' and Assistant Naval Secretary Franklin D. Roosevelt's attempts under the Woodrow administration to "democratize" the Navy, saw Stearns' actions as a move which could subvert naval authority by implementing organizations similar to labor unions, claiming it resembled a "Soviet spirit [which] had crept into the Navy." After petitions from various Admirals of the United States Atlantic Fleet, Secretary of the Navy Edwin Denby stripped Stearns of command, and transferred him to the Puget Sound Naval Shipyard and Intermediate Maintenance Facility, claiming that allowing sailors to advise officers was against naval tradition and broke down disciplinary authority.

After the 1923 Great Kantō earthquake, Stearns led the emergency relief efforts, and received a medal from the Japanese Red Cross; he sent this medal back to Japan following the Attack on Pearl Harbor. He also served as a lighthouse inspector.

== Governorship ==
Stearns became the ninth Governor of American Samoa on July 14, 1913, relieving Nathan Woodworth Post. While Governor, he set up three committees to aid Samoans in becoming more involved in government. These committees were "Committee A: Executive Committee, consisting of District Governors; Committee B: Committee of the Samoan Hospital, with three members from each district, and Committee C: Auditing Committee, to give the fullest publicity to the statement of government accounts." He further established the American Samoan Judicial, Treasury, Interior, Agriculture, and Public Health Departments. Stearns gave command back to Lt. Post on October 2, 1914.

Governor Stearns founded American Sāmoa's first bank by subscribing US$5,000 in government capital and appointing a civilian manager. Adoption was gradual among Samoans, but the institution proved a boon to local merchants and the territorial economy.
