= Nathan Post =

Nathan W. Post
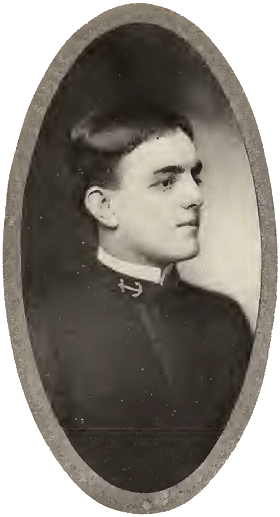
- Post at Annapolis in 1904

Governor of American Samoa
- In office October 2, 1914 – December 16, 1914
- Preceded by: Clark Daniel Stearns
- Succeeded by: Charles Armijo Woodruff
- In office March 14, 1913 – July 13, 1914
- Preceded by: William Michael Crose
- Succeeded by: Clark Daniel Stearns

Personal details
- Born: August 3, 1881 Fonda, Iowa, U.S.
- Died: May 30, 1938 (aged 56)
- Education: United States Naval Academy

Military service
- Allegiance: United States
- Branch/service: United States Navy
- Years of service: 1904–1937
- Rank: Captain
- Commands: USS Detroit; USS Farragut
- Battles/wars: World War I

Nathan Woodworth Post (August 3, 1881 – May 30, 1938) was the governor of American Samoa. He graduated from the United States Naval Academy in 1904, and commanded USS Detroit and the Naval Recruiting Station in Omaha, Nebraska. He served two terms as governor: from March 14 to July 14, 1913, and from October 2 to December 16, 1914. He is the first American Samoan governor to serve to two non-consecutive terms.

== Early life ==
Post was born in Fonda, Iowa on August 3, 1881. His son was Nathan Topliff Post, a United States Marine Corps World War II ace.

== Naval career ==
Post was appointed to the United States Naval Academy from Nebraska in 1900. He graduated in 1904, and served two years as a midshipman at sea before receiving his commission.

As an ensign, Post served on USS Louisiana. Post served as the personnel officer of the 12th Naval District. In 1910, he was in charge of the Naval Recruiting Station in Omaha, Nebraska. He was made a commander in 1916. In 1922 he was placed in command of USS Farragut in San Diego, California. In 1931, he was placed in command of USS Detroit. Post retired from active duty on February 1, 1937.

== Governorship ==
Post relieved William Michael Crose of the governorship on March 14, 1913, serving until July 14 of the same year. He served a second term from October 2 to December 16, 1914. This made him the first Governor of American Samoa to serve exactly two non-consecutive terms; the only other ever to do so was Gatewood Lincoln.

== Later life ==
After his death, Post was interred at San Francisco National Cemetery on June 20, 1938.
