= Lyndon Center, Vermont =

Census-designated place in Vermont, United States

- Census-designated place
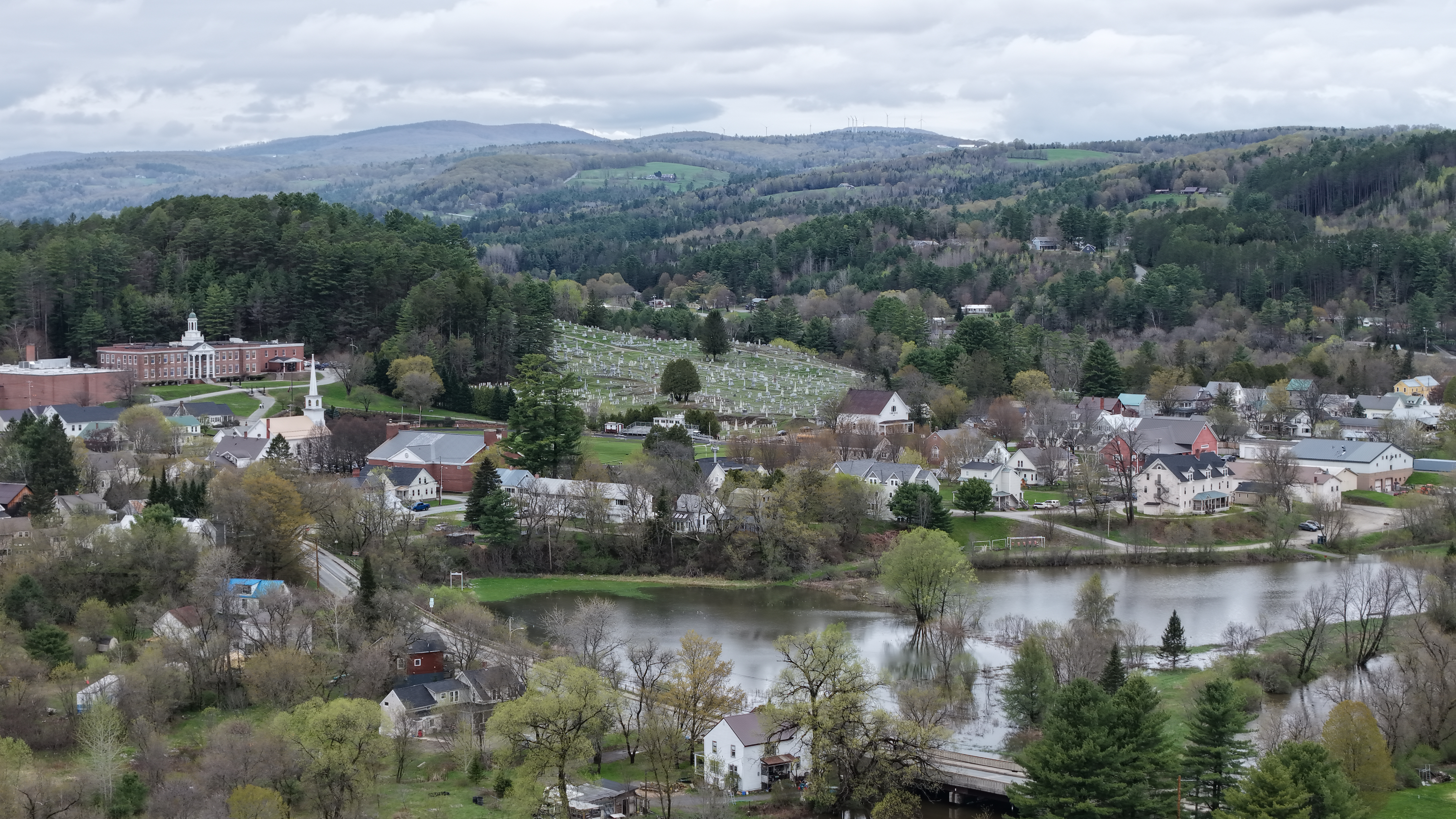
- View of Lyndon Center, VT, from the southeast

- Location within Vermont Location within the United States
- Coordinates: 44°32′16″N 72°00′51″W
- Country: United States
- State: Vermont
- County: Caledonia
- Town: Lyndon

Area
  - Total: 0.40 sq mi (1.03 km^{2})
  - Land: 0.38 sq mi (0.99 km^{2})
  - Water: 0.015 sq mi (0.04 km^{2})
- Elevation: 728 ft (222 m)
- Time zone: UTC-5 (Eastern (EST))
  - Summer (DST): UTC-4 (EDT)
- ZIP code: 05850
- Area code: 802
- GNIS feature ID: 2807127
- FIPS code: 50-41800

Lyndon Center is an unincorporated village and census-designated place (CDP) in the town of Lyndon, Caledonia, Vermont, United States. As of the 2020 census, Lyndon Center had a population of 187. The community is located along the western border of Lyndonville. Lyndon Center has a post office with ZIP code 05850. The community was first listed as a CDP prior to the 2020 census.
