= La Joy-Clinique railway station =

Railway station in Genolier, Switzerland

La Joy-Clinique
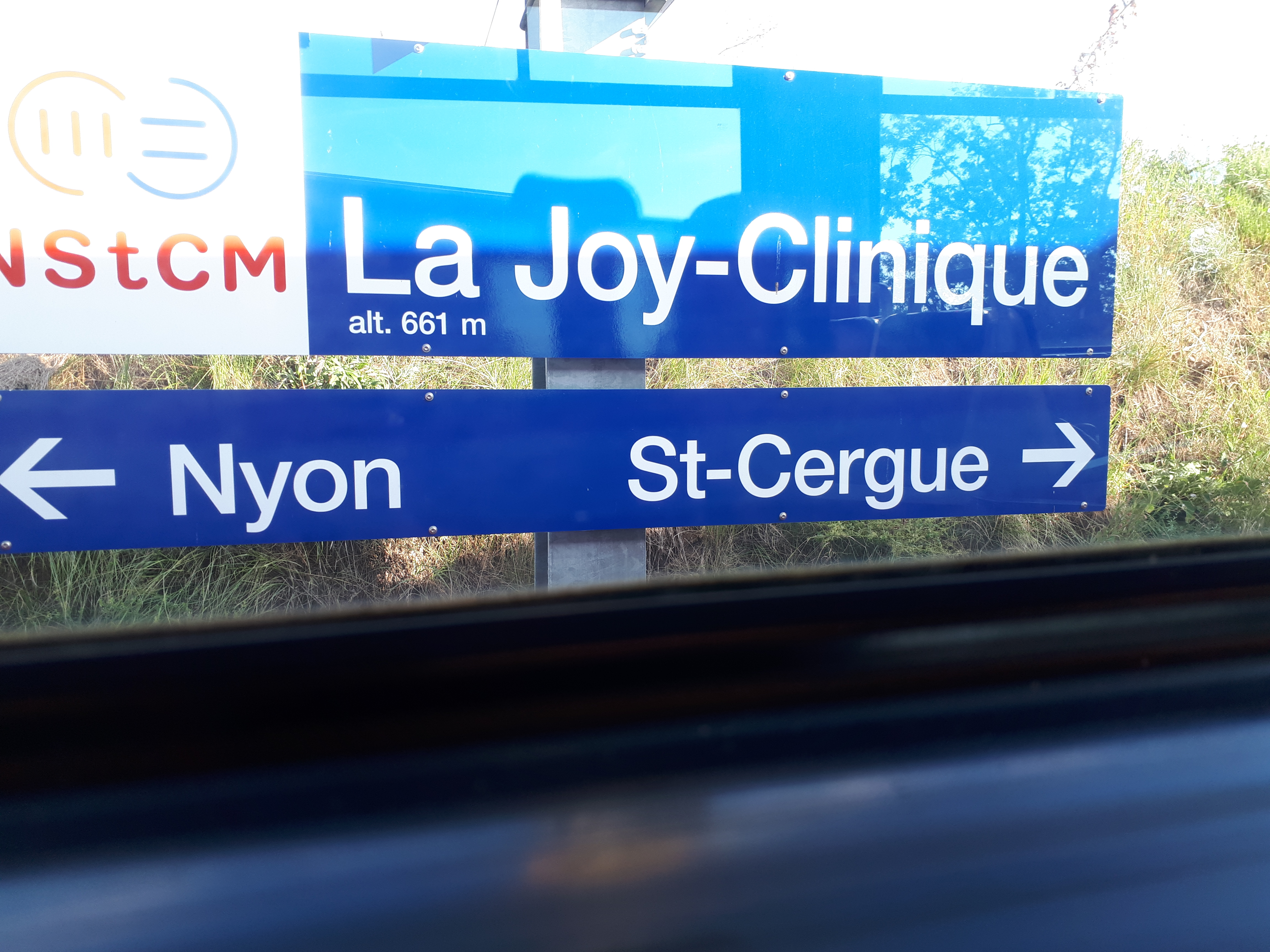
- The station sign in 2018

General information
- Location: Genolier, Vaud; Switzerland
- Coordinates: 46°26′46″N 6°13′01″E
- Elevation: 668 m (2,192 ft)
- Owner: Chemin de fer Nyon–St-Cergue–Morez
- Line: Nyon–St-Cergue–Morez line
- Distance: 9.8 km (6.1 mi) from Nyon
- Platforms: 1 side platform
- Tracks: 1
- Train operators: Chemin de fer Nyon–St-Cergue–Morez

Construction
- Accessible: Yes

Other information
- Station code: 8501058 (JOCL)
- Fare zone: 92 (mobilis)

History
- Opened: 12 July 1916

Services
Preceding station	NStCM	Following station
Le Muids towards St-Cergue or La Cure	R55	Sus-Châtel towards Nyon
Location

La Joy-Clinique railway station (French: Gare de La Joy-Clinique), is a railway station in the municipality of Genolier, in the Swiss canton of Vaud. It is an intermediate stop and a request stop on the 1,000 mm (3 ft 3 3/8 in) metre gauge Nyon–St-Cergue–Morez line of Chemin de fer Nyon–St-Cergue–Morez.

== Services ==
As of the December 2023 timetable change, the following services stop at La Joy-Clinique:

- Regio: half-hourly service between Nyon and St-Cergue, with every other train continuing from St-Cergue to La Cure.

== Bibliography ==
- Wägli, Hans G.; Jacobi, Sébastien (2010). Schienennetz Schweiz - Bahnprofil Schweiz CH+ [Swiss rail network] (in German) (3rd ed.). Zürich: AS Verlag. ISBN 978-3-909111-74-9.
