= Le Muids railway station =

Railway station in Arzier-Le Muids, Switzerland

Le Muids
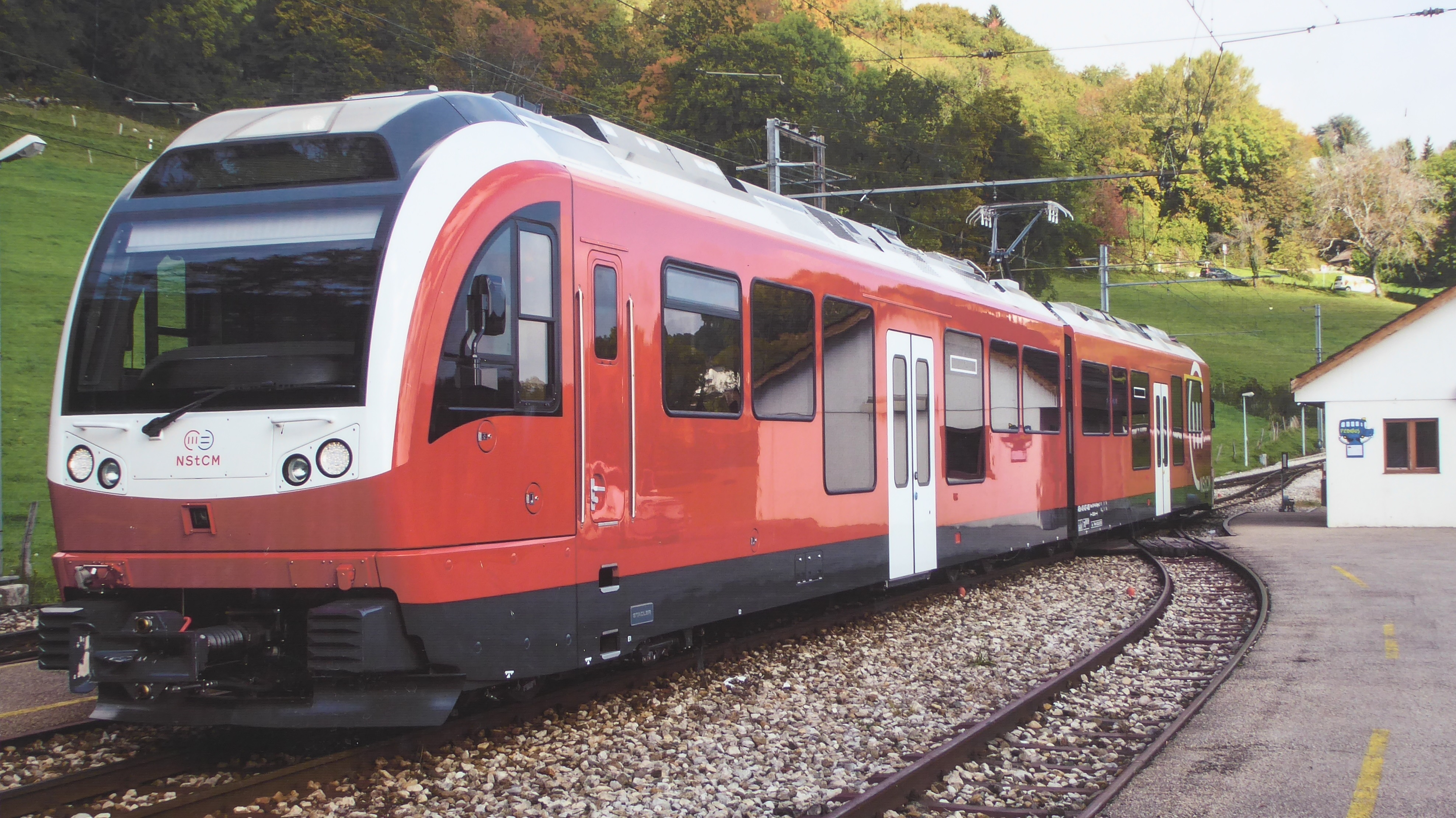
- A train at the station in 2018

General information
- Location: Arzier-Le Muids, Vaud; Switzerland
- Coordinates: 46°27′14″N 6°12′54″E
- Elevation: 715 m (2,346 ft)
- Owner: Chemin de fer Nyon–St-Cergue–Morez
- Line: Nyon–St-Cergue–Morez line
- Distance: 11.1 km (6.9 mi) from Nyon
- Platforms: 2 (1 island platform)
- Tracks: 3
- Train operators: Chemin de fer Nyon–St-Cergue–Morez

Construction
- Accessible: No

Other information
- Station code: 8501065 (MUI)
- Fare zone: 92 and 93 (mobilis)

History
- Opened: 12 July 1916

Services
Preceding station	NStCM	Following station
Bassins towards St-Cergue or La Cure	R55	La Joy-Clinique towards Nyon
Location

Le Muids railway station (French: Gare du Muids) is in the municipality of Arzier-Le Muids, in the Swiss canton of Vaud. It is an intermediate stop and a request stop on the 1,000 mm (3 ft 3 3/8 in) metre gauge Nyon–St-Cergue–Morez line of Chemin de fer Nyon–St-Cergue–Morez.

== Services ==
As of the December 2023 timetable change, the following services stop at Le Muids:

- Regio: half-hourly service between Nyon and St-Cergue, with every other train continuing from St-Cergue to La Cure.

== Bibliography ==
- Wägli, Hans G.; Jacobi, Sébastien (2010). Schienennetz Schweiz - Bahnprofil Schweiz CH+ [Swiss rail network] (in German) (3rd ed.). Zürich: AS Verlag. ISBN 978-3-909111-74-9.
