= Trélex railway station =

Railway station in Trélex, Switzerland

Trélex
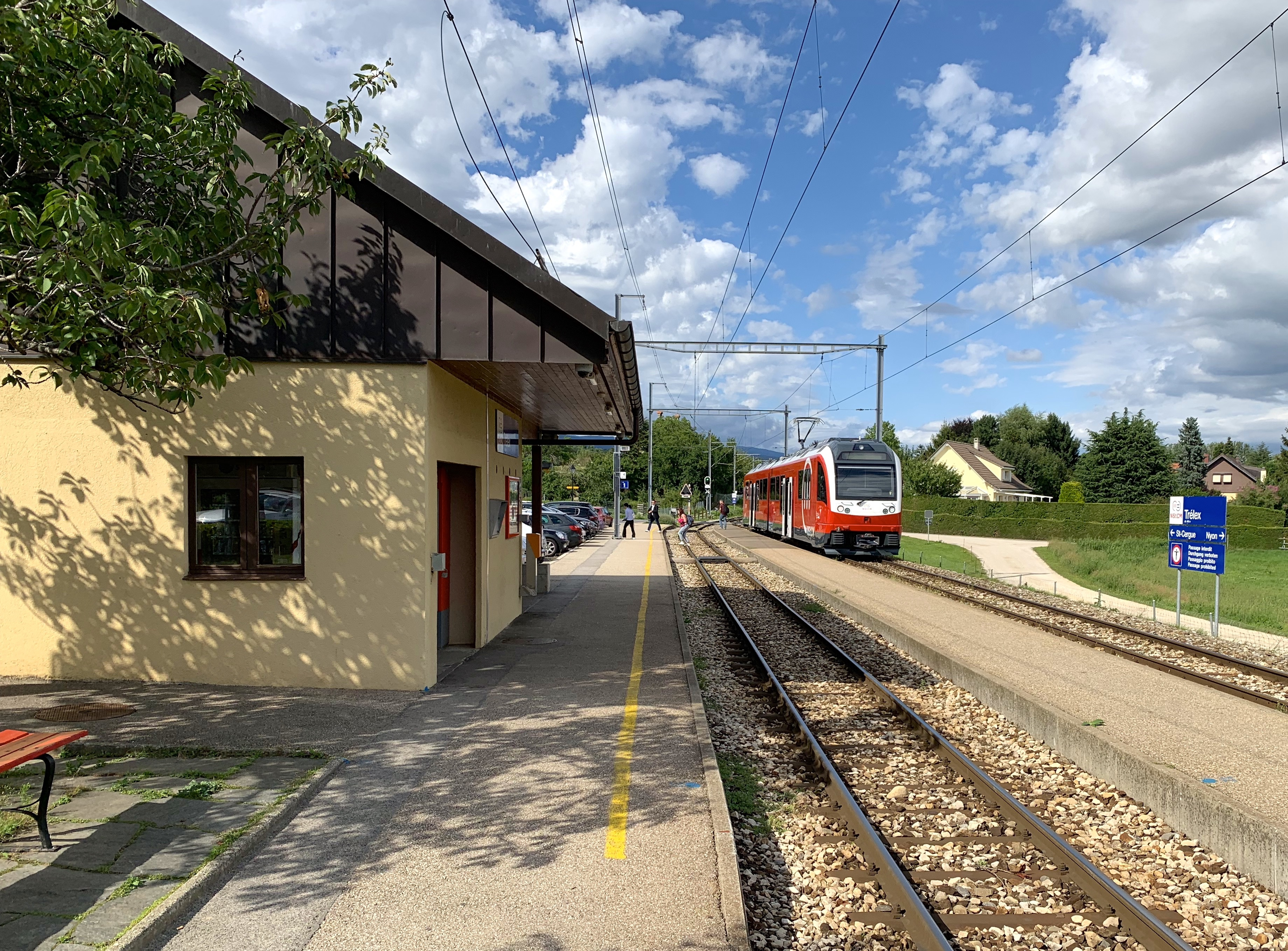
- The station in 2019

General information
- Location: Trélex, Vaud; Switzerland
- Coordinates: 46°24′50″N 6°12′22″E
- Elevation: 501 m (1,644 ft)
- Owner: Chemin de fer Nyon–St-Cergue–Morez
- Line: Nyon–St-Cergue–Morez line
- Distance: 4.4 km (2.7 mi) from Nyon
- Platforms: 2
- Tracks: 2
- Train operators: Chemin de fer Nyon–St-Cergue–Morez

Construction
- Accessible: No

Other information
- Station code: 8501068 (TREL)
- Fare zone: 91 (mobilis)

History
- Opened: 12 July 1916

Services
Preceding station	NStCM	Following station
Givrins towards Genolier, St-Cergue or La Cure	R55	Trélex dépôt towards Nyon
Location

Trélex railway station (French: Gare de Trélex), is a railway station in the municipality of Trélex, in the Swiss canton of Vaud. It is an intermediate stop and a request stop on the 1,000 mm (3 ft 3 3/8 in) metre gauge Nyon–St-Cergue–Morez line of Chemin de fer Nyon–St-Cergue–Morez.

== History ==
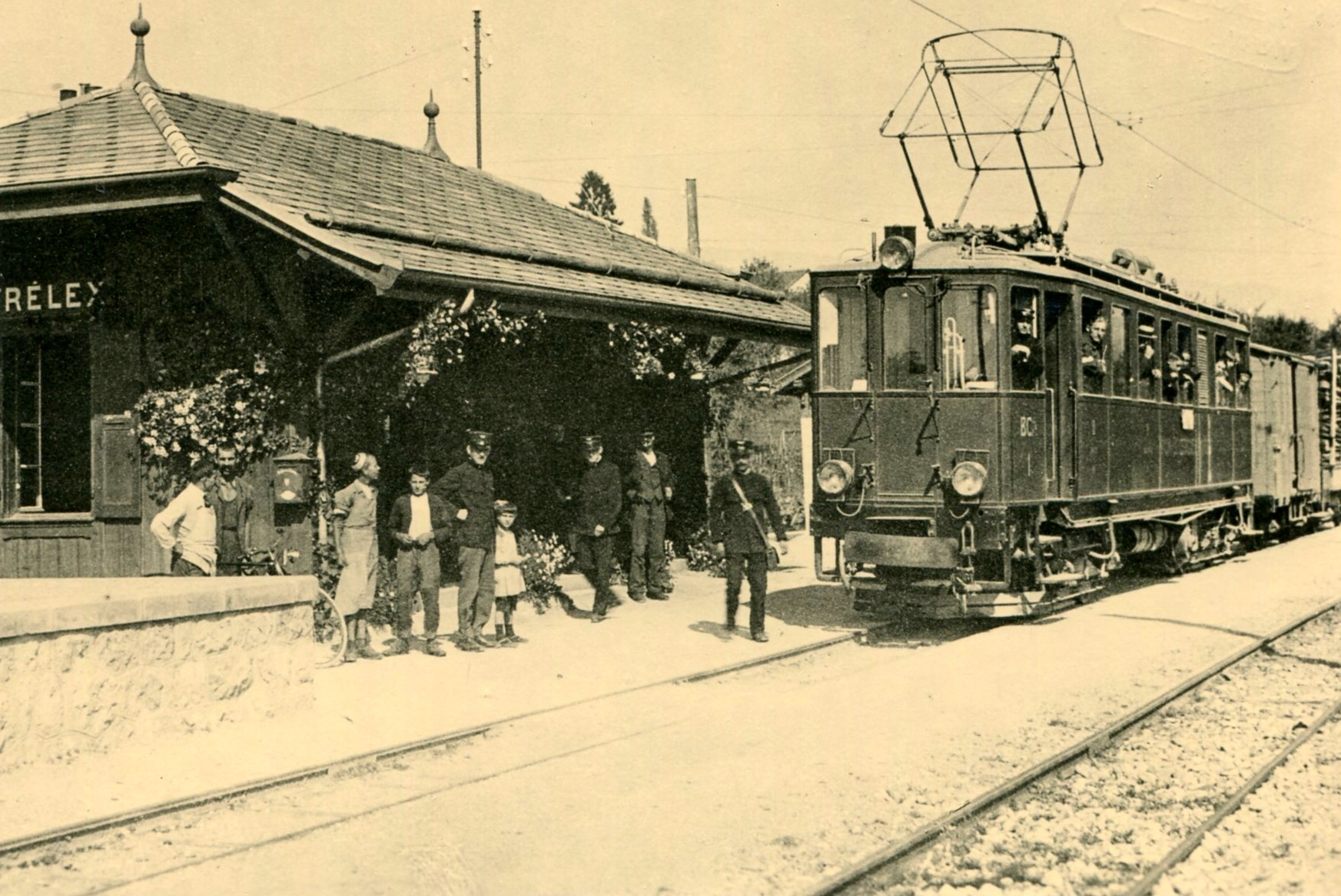
The old Trélex station

The old Trélex station was built in wood between 1915 and 1916 and inaugurated on July 26, 1916. It had a waiting room for passengers, a ticket counter, and an office.

In very poor condition and often vandalized, the deteriorating building no longer provided all the required services. The railway company therefore decided to demolish this 70-year-old station and replace it with a new small prefabricated concrete building. The new station was erected opposite the post office, near residential buildings.

In 1985, the railway company submitted for public consultation a plan to modify the tracks and restructure the station's surroundings. The length of the station was extended from 68 to 136 meters, with new switches installed. The new station consisted of four rooms, including a waiting room and a bike shelter. The platforms were also improved with a hard-surface coating.

The surroundings of the station, in agreement with the municipality of Trélex, were enhanced with a car parking area and a widened access road. In 2002, to curb acts of vandalism, the railway company installed surveillance cameras. Additional cameras were also installed along the entire line.

== Services ==
As of the December 2023 timetable change, the following services stop at Trélex:

- Regio:
  - Weekdays: service every 15 minutes between Nyon and Genolier, half-hourly service from Genolier to St-Cergue, with every other train continuing from St-Cergue to La Cure.
  - Weekends: half-hourly service between Nyon and St-Cergue, with every other train continuing from St-Cergue to La Cure.

== Bibliography ==
- Wägli, Hans G.; Jacobi, Sébastien (2010). Schienennetz Schweiz - Bahnprofil Schweiz CH+ [Swiss rail network] (in German) (3rd ed.). Zürich: AS Verlag. ISBN 978-3-909111-74-9.
