= Les Plantaz railway station =

Railway station in Nyon, Switzerland

Les Plantaz
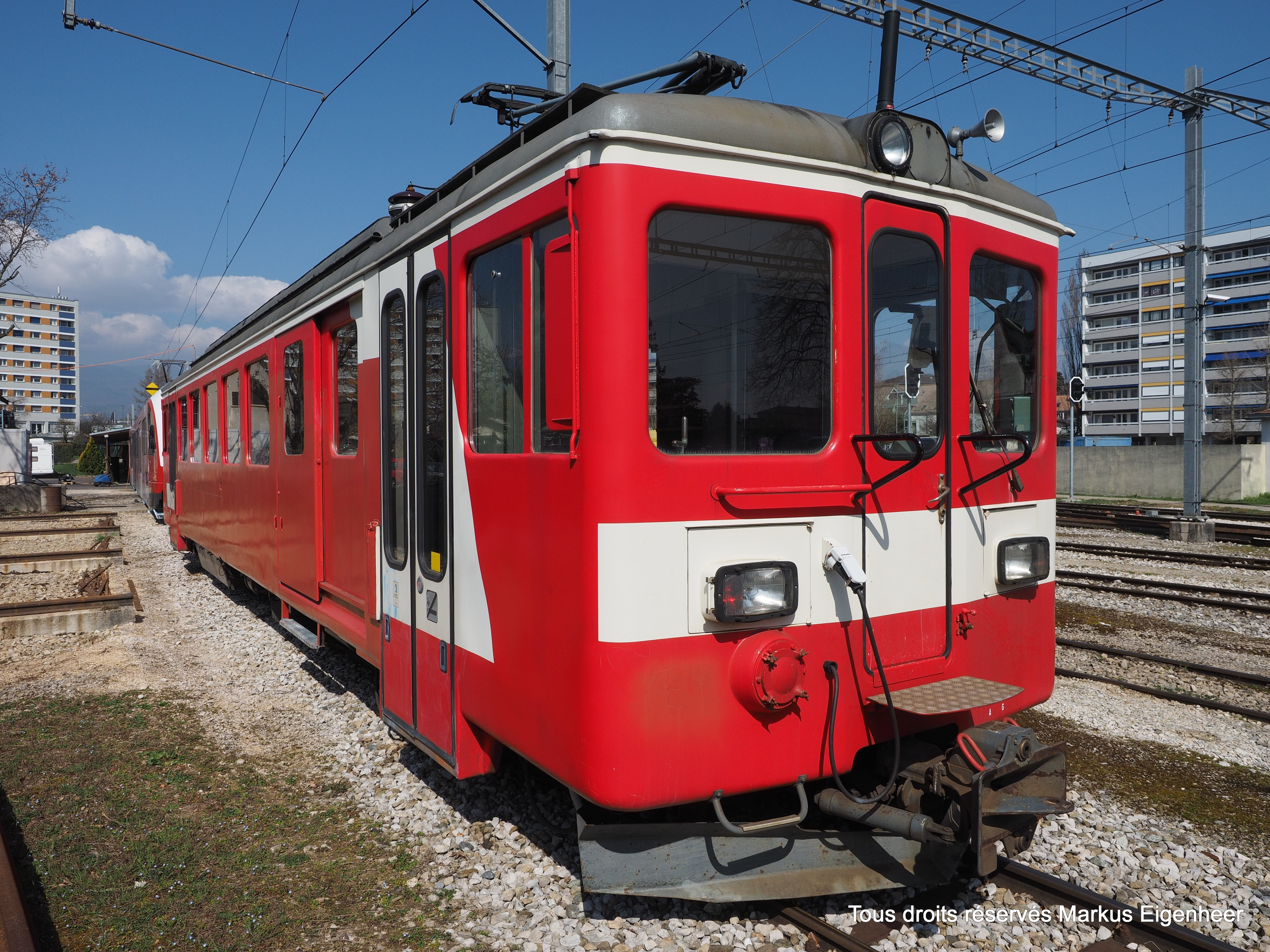
- A train at the station in 2015

General information
- Location: Nyon, Vaud; Switzerland
- Coordinates: 46°23′28″N 6°13′44″E
- Elevation: 420 m (1,380 ft)
- Owner: Chemin de fer Nyon–St-Cergue–Morez
- Line: Nyon–St-Cergue–Morez line
- Distance: 1.1 km (0.68 mi) from Nyon
- Platforms: 2
- Tracks: 3
- Train operators: Chemin de fer Nyon–St-Cergue–Morez

Construction
- Accessible: No

Other information
- Station code: 8501059 (PLAN)
- Fare zone: 20 (mobilis)

History
- Opened: 12 July 1916

Services
Preceding station	NStCM	Following station
La Vuarpillière towards Genolier, St-Cergue or La Cure	R55	Nyon Terminus
Location

Les Plantaz railway station (French: Gare de Les Plantaz), is a railway station in the municipality of Nyon, in the Swiss canton of Vaud. It is an intermediate stop and a request stop on the 1,000 mm (3 ft 3 3/8 in) metre gauge Nyon–St-Cergue–Morez line of Chemin de fer Nyon–St-Cergue–Morez.

== Services ==
As of the December 2023 timetable change, the following services stop at Les Plantaz:

- Regio:
  - Weekdays: service every 15 minutes between Nyon and Genolier, half-hourly service from Genolier to St-Cergue, with every other train continuing from St-Cergue to La Cure.
  - Weekends: half-hourly service between Nyon and St-Cergue, with every other train continuing from St-Cergue to La Cure.

== Bibliography ==
- Wägli, Hans G.; Jacobi, Sébastien (2010). Schienennetz Schweiz - Bahnprofil Schweiz CH+ [Swiss rail network] (in German) (3rd ed.). Zürich: AS Verlag. ISBN 978-3-909111-74-9.
