= La Chèvrerie-Monterêt railway station =

Railway station in Arzier-Le Muids, Switzerland

La Chèvrerie-Monterêt
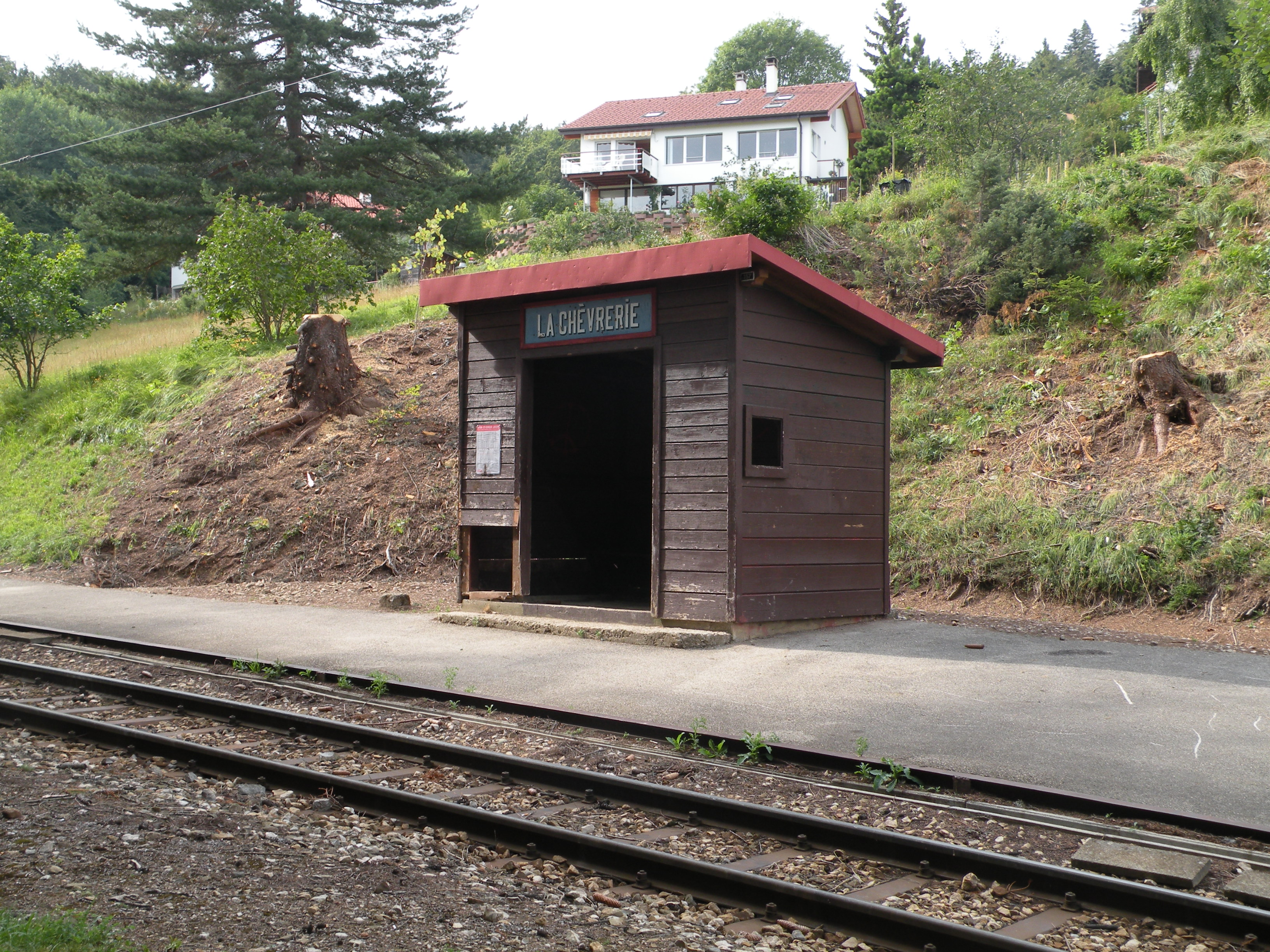
- The station shelter in 2009

General information
- Location: Arzier-Le Muids, Vaud; Switzerland
- Coordinates: 46°26′53″N 6°11′02″E
- Elevation: 970 m (3,180 ft)
- Owner: Chemin de fer Nyon–St-Cergue–Morez
- Line: Nyon–St-Cergue–Morez line
- Distance: 17.1 km (10.6 mi) from Nyon
- Platforms: 1 side platform
- Tracks: 1
- Train operators: Chemin de fer Nyon–St-Cergue–Morez

Construction
- Accessible: No

Other information
- Station code: 8501057 (CHMO)
- Fare zone: 93 and 94 (mobilis)

History
- Opened: 12 July 1916
- Former names: La Chèvrerie-Monteret

Services
Preceding station	NStCM	Following station
St-Cergue towards La Cure	R55	Arzier towards Nyon
St-Cergue Terminus	R55	Arzier towards Nyon
Location

La Chèvrerie-Monterêt railway station (French: Gare de La Chèvrerie-Monterêt), is a railway station in the municipality of Arzier-Le Muids, in the Swiss canton of Vaud. It is an intermediate stop and a request stop on the 1,000 mm (3 ft 3 3/8 in) metre gauge Nyon–St-Cergue–Morez line of Chemin de fer Nyon–St-Cergue–Morez.

== Services ==
As of the December 2023 timetable change, the following services stop at La Chèvrerie-Monterêt:

- Regio: half-hourly service between Nyon and St-Cergue, with every other train continuing from St-Cergue to La Cure.

== Bibliography ==
- Wägli, Hans G.; Jacobi, Sébastien (2010). Schienennetz Schweiz - Bahnprofil Schweiz CH+ [Swiss rail network] (in German) (3rd ed.). Zürich: AS Verlag. ISBN 978-3-909111-74-9.
