= La Givrine railway station =

Railway station in Saint-Cergue, Switzerland

La Givrine
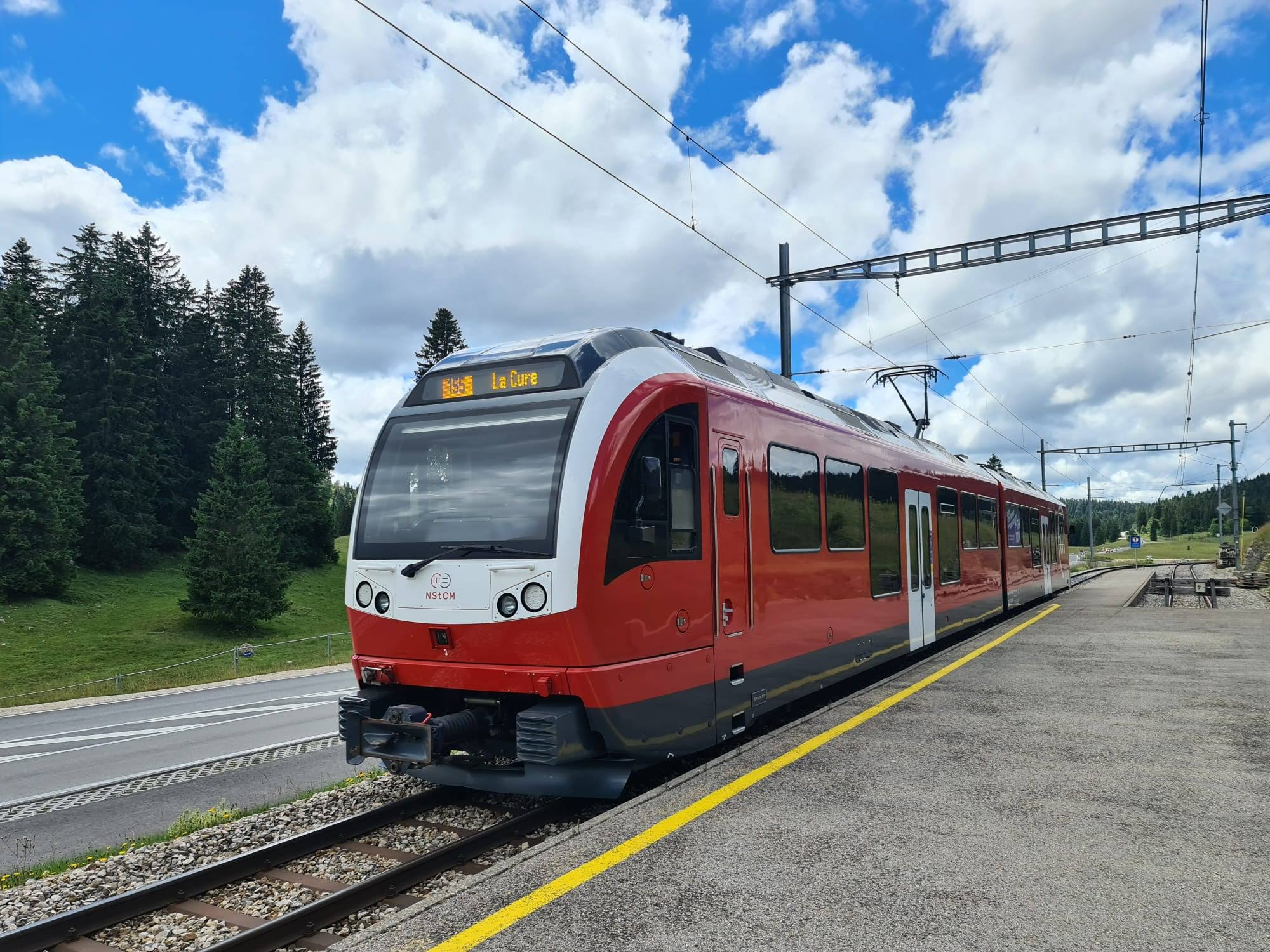
- A train at the station in 2022

General information
- Location: Saint-Cergue, Vaud; Switzerland
- Coordinates: 46°27′16″N 6°06′40″E
- Elevation: 1,208 m (3,963 ft)
- Owner: Chemin de fer Nyon–St-Cergue–Morez
- Line: Nyon–St-Cergue–Morez line
- Distance: 23.3 km (14.5 mi) from Nyon
- Platforms: 1 side platform
- Tracks: 2
- Train operators: Chemin de fer Nyon–St-Cergue–Morez

Construction
- Accessible: No

Other information
- Station code: 8501061 (GIVR)
- Fare zone: 95 (mobilis)

History
- Opened: 18 August 1917

Services
Preceding station	NStCM	Following station
La Cure Terminus	R55	Les Pralies towards Nyon
Location

La Givrine railway station (French: Gare de La Givrine), is a railway station in the municipality of Saint-Cergue, in the Swiss canton of Vaud. It is an intermediate stop and a request stop on the 1,000 mm (3 ft 3 3/8 in) metre gauge Nyon–St-Cergue–Morez line of Chemin de fer Nyon–St-Cergue–Morez.

== Services ==
As of the December 2023 timetable change, the following services stop at La Givrine:

- Regio: hourly service between Nyon and La Cure.

== Bibliography ==
- Wägli, Hans G.; Jacobi, Sébastien (2010). Schienennetz Schweiz - Bahnprofil Schweiz CH+ [Swiss rail network] (in German) (3rd ed.). Zürich: AS Verlag. ISBN 978-3-909111-74-9.
