= Genolier railway station =

Railway station in Genolier, Switzerland

Genolier
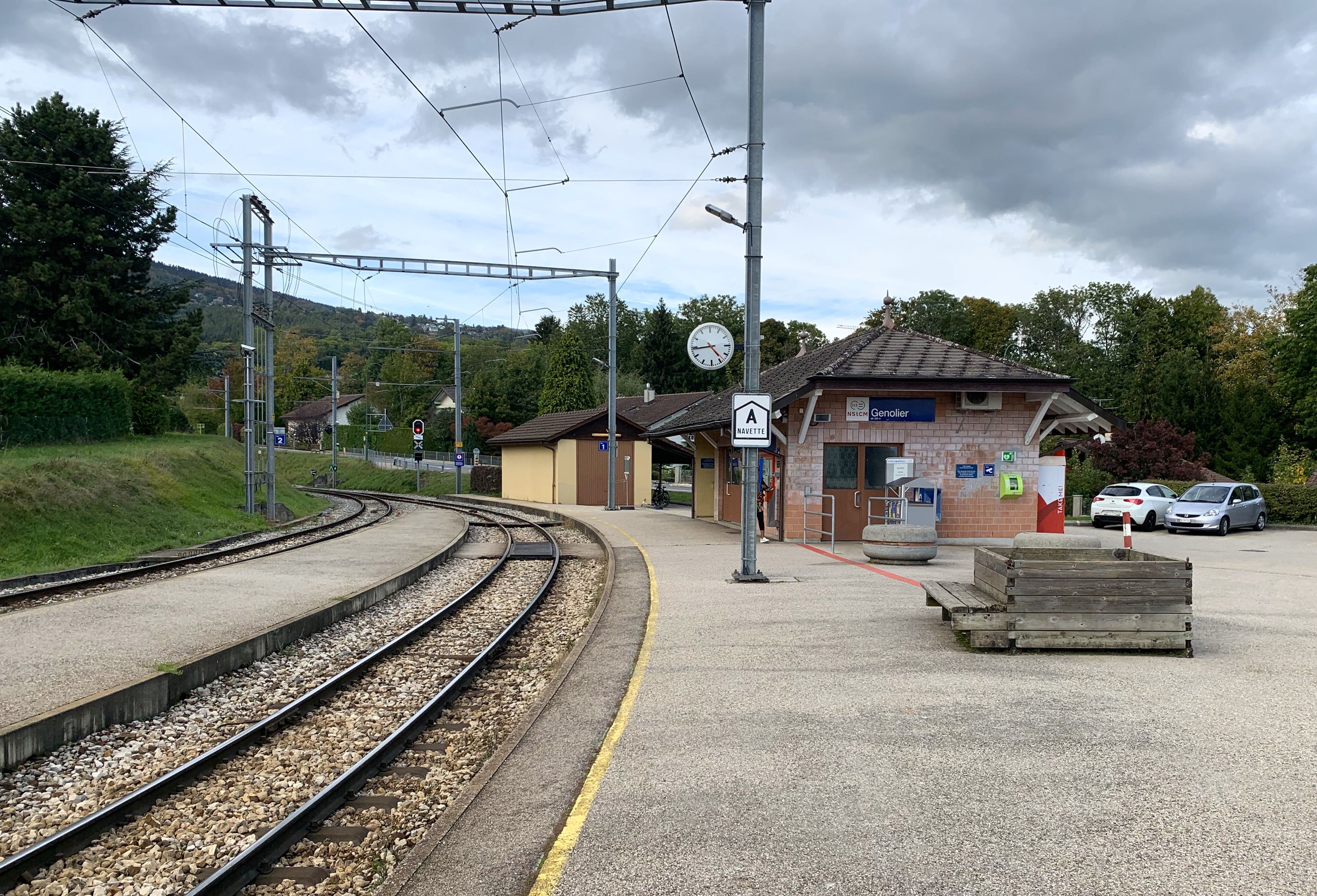
- The station in 2020

General information
- Location: Genolier, Vaud; Switzerland
- Coordinates: 46°26′10″N 6°12′54″E
- Elevation: 562 m (1,844 ft)
- Owner: Chemin de fer Nyon–St-Cergue–Morez
- Line: Nyon–St-Cergue–Morez line
- Distance: 7.5 km (4.7 mi) from Nyon
- Platforms: 2
- Tracks: 2
- Train operators: Chemin de fer Nyon–St-Cergue–Morez

Construction
- Accessible: No

Other information
- Station code: 8501066 (GEN)
- Fare zone: 92 (mobilis)

History
- Opened: 12 July 1916

Services
Preceding station	NStCM	Following station
Sus-Châtel towards St-Cergue or La Cure	R55	Givrins towards Nyon
Terminus	R55	Givrins towards Nyon
Location

Genolier railway station (French: Gare de Genolier), is a railway station in the municipality of Genolier, in the Swiss canton of Vaud. It is an intermediate stop and a request stop on the 1,000 mm (3 ft 3 3/8 in) metre gauge Nyon–St-Cergue–Morez line of Chemin de fer Nyon–St-Cergue–Morez.

== History ==
Between Summer 2024 and December 2025, the station's infrastructure will be upgraded. Two new station platforms with canopies will be built, a new underground passage will be built, the technical infrastructure will be modernized and extra parking spaces built for bikes and cars.

== Services ==
As of the December 2023 timetable change, the following services stop at Genolier:

- Regio:
  - Weekdays: service every 15 minutes to Nyon, half-hourly service to St-Cergue, with every other train continuing from St-Cergue to La Cure.
  - Weekends: half-hourly service between Nyon and St-Cergue, with every other train continuing from St-Cergue to La Cure.

== Bibliography ==
- Wägli, Hans G.; Jacobi, Sébastien (2010). Schienennetz Schweiz - Bahnprofil Schweiz CH+ [Swiss rail network] (in German) (3rd ed.). Zürich: AS Verlag. ISBN 978-3-909111-74-9.
