= Oujon Charterhouse =

Ruins of a 12th-century Carthusian monastery in Switzerland

- Chartreuse d'Oujon
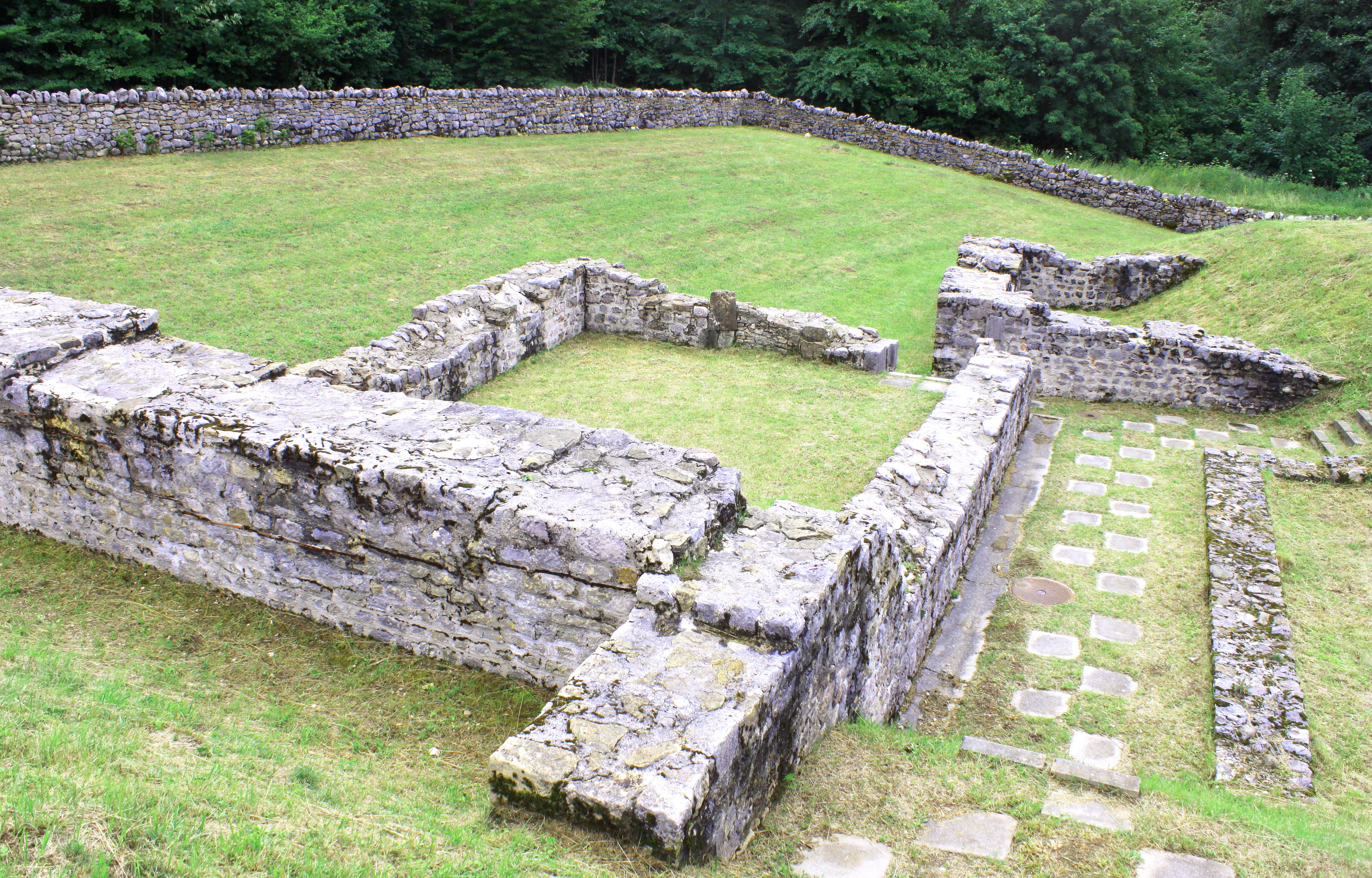
- Ruins of Oujon Charterhouse

- Location within Switzerland Location within Canton of Vaud

Religion
- Affiliation: Carthusians, Roman Catholic
- Province: Vaud
- Year consecrated: 1146/49
- Status: Ruined

Location
- Municipality: Arzier-Le Muids
- Country: Switzerland
- Interactive map of Oujon Charterhouse
- Coordinates: 46.4644676°N 6.181612°E

Architecture
- Swiss Cultural Property of National Significance

Oujon Charterhouse (French: Chartreuse d'Oujon) was a Carthusian monastery or charterhouse near Arzier-Le Muids in the canton of Vaud, Switzerland, founded in 1146/49 and dissolved in 1537. It is a cultural property of national significance (class A).

== Priors ==
- Hugo (before 1185)
- Guigo (c.1195)
- Gaucher (c.1210)
