= Genolier =

- Municipality
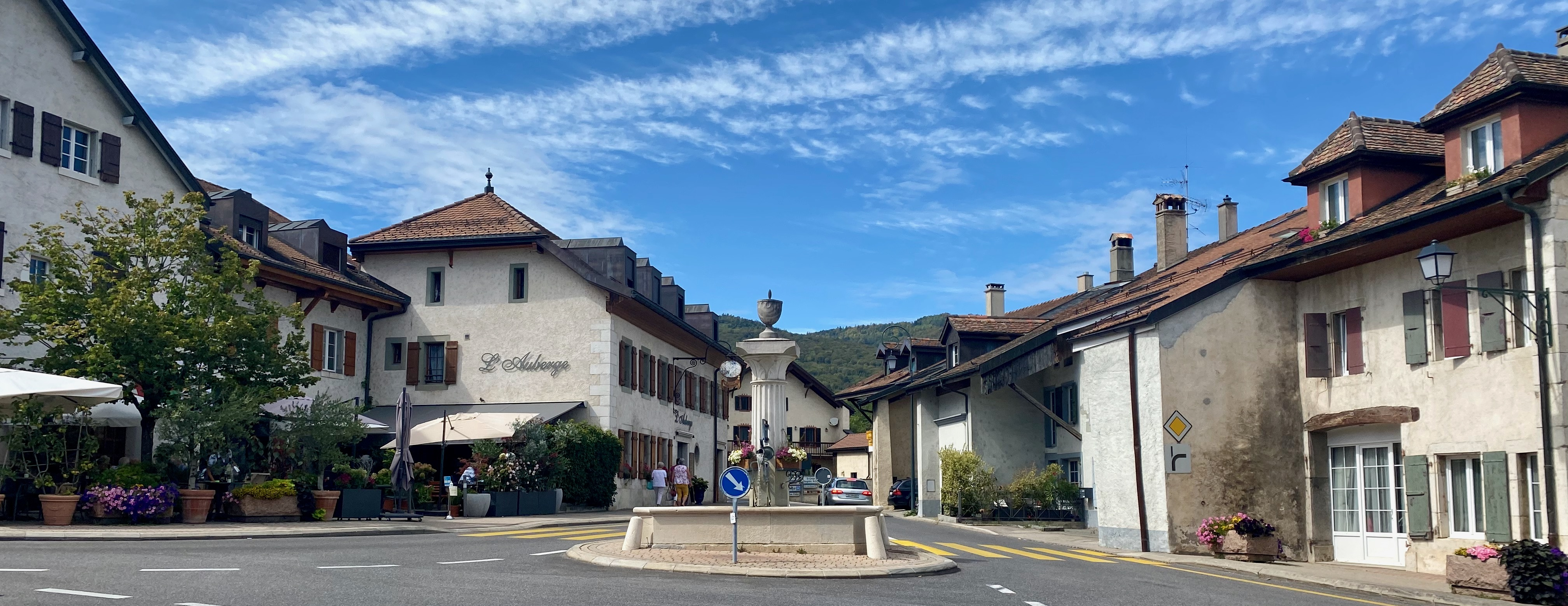

- Flag Coat of arms
- Location of Genolier
- Location within Switzerland Location within Canton of Vaud
- Coordinates: 46°26′N 6°13′E
- Country: Switzerland
- Canton: Vaud
- District: Nyon

Government
  - Mayor: Syndic

Area
  - Total: 4.9 km^{2} (1.9 sq mi)
- Elevation: 547 m (1,795 ft)

Population (2008)
  - Total: 1,698
  - Density: 350/km^{2} (900/sq mi)
- Time zone: UTC+01:00 (CET)
  - Summer (DST): UTC+02:00 (CEST)
- Postal code: 1272
- SFOS number: 5718
- ISO 3166 code: CH-VD
- Surrounded by: Arzier-Le Muids, Coinsins, Duillier, Givrins, Vich
- Website: www.genolier.ch

Genolier is a municipality in the district of Nyon in the canton of Vaud in Switzerland.

== History ==
Genolier is first mentioned in 1110 as Genolliacum.

== Geography ==
Genolier has an area, as of 2009, of 4.9 square kilometers (1.9 mi^{2}). Of this area, 2.18 km^{2} (0.84 mi^{2}) or 44.8% is used for agricultural purposes, while 1.72 km^{2} (0.66 mi^{2}) or 35.3% is forested. Of the rest of the land, 0.91 km^{2} (0.35 mi^{2}) or 18.7% is settled (buildings or roads) and 0.06 km^{2} (15 acres) or 1.2% is unproductive land.

Of the built up area, housing and buildings made up 12.3% and transportation infrastructure made up 4.3%. Out of the forested land, 32.4% of the total land area is heavily forested and 2.9% is covered with orchards or small clusters of trees. Of the agricultural land, 29.4% is used for growing crops and 10.1% is pastures, while 5.3% is used for orchards or vine crops.

The municipality was part of the Nyon District until it was dissolved on 31 August 2006, and Genolier became part of the new district of Nyon.

The municipality is located along the Nyon-Arzier road. It consists of the haufendorf village (an irregular, unplanned and quite closely packed village, built around a central square) of Genolier.

== Coat of arms ==
The blazon of the municipal coat of arms is Or, from a Base Vert growing three Trees of the same.

== Demographics ==
Genolier has a population (as of December 2020) of 1,989. As of 2008, 26.9% of the population are resident foreign nationals. Over the last 10 years (1999–2009) the population has changed at a rate of 20.8%. It has changed at a rate of 14.1% due to migration and at a rate of 6.4% due to births and deaths.

Most of the population (as of 2000) speaks French (1,076 or 72.0%), with German being second most common (188 or 12.6%) and English being third (145 or 9.7%). There are 16 people who speak Italian.

The age distribution, as of 2009, in Genolier is; 211 children or 11.9% of the population are between 0 and 9 years old and 259 teenagers or 14.6% are between 10 and 19. Of the adult population, 163 people or 9.2% of the population are between 20 and 29 years old. 223 people or 12.5% are between 30 and 39, 311 people or 17.5% are between 40 and 49, and 242 people or 13.6% are between 50 and 59. The senior population distribution is 223 people or 12.5% of the population are between 60 and 69 years old, 85 people or 4.8% are between 70 and 79, there are 55 people or 3.1% who are between 80 and 89, and there are 6 people or 0.3% who are 90 and older.

As of 2000, there were 586 people who were single and never married in the municipality. There were 797 married individuals, 45 widows or widowers and 66 individuals who are divorced.

As of 2000, there were 559 private households in the municipality, and an average of 2.6 persons per household. There were 126 households that consist of only one person and 42 households with five or more people. Out of a total of 570 households that answered this question, 22.1% were households made up of just one person and there were 3 adults who lived with their parents. Of the rest of the households, there are 153 married couples without children, 246 married couples with children There were 25 single parents with a child or children. There were 6 households that were made up of unrelated people and 11 households that were made up of some sort of institution or another collective housing.

In 2000 there were 381 single family homes (or 79.7% of the total) out of a total of 478 inhabited buildings. There were 56 multi-family buildings (11.7%), along with 22 multi-purpose buildings that were mostly used for housing (4.6%) and 19 other use buildings (commercial or industrial) that also had some housing (4.0%).

In 2000, a total of 536 apartments (86.0% of the total) were permanently occupied, while 69 apartments (11.1%) were seasonally occupied and 18 apartments (2.9%) were empty. As of 2009, the construction rate of new housing units was 3.3 new units per 1000 residents. The vacancy rate for the municipality, in 2010, was 0%.

The historical population is given in the following chart:

== Politics ==
In the 2007 federal election the most popular party was the FDP which received 33.82% of the vote. The next three most popular parties were the SVP (18.56%), the LPS Party (11.41%) and the Green Party (10.54%). In the federal election, a total of 546 votes were cast, and the voter turnout was 56.9%.

== Economy ==
As of 2010, Genolier had an unemployment rate of 3.9%. As of 2008, there were 25 people employed in the primary economic sector and about 7 businesses involved in this sector. 57 people were employed in the secondary sector and there were 9 businesses in this sector. 451 people were employed in the tertiary sector, with 48 businesses in this sector. There were 723 residents of the municipality who were employed in some capacity, of which females made up 39.1% of the workforce.

In 2008 the total number of full-time equivalent jobs was 458. The number of jobs in the primary sector was 20, of which 14 were in agriculture and 5 were in forestry or lumber production. The number of jobs in the secondary sector was 53 of which 28 or (52.8%) were in manufacturing and 26 (49.1%) were in construction. The number of jobs in the tertiary sector was 385. In the tertiary sector; 20 or 5.2% were in wholesale or retail sales or the repair of motor vehicles, 3 or 0.8% were in the movement and storage of goods, 15 or 3.9% were in a hotel or restaurant, 1 was in the information industry, 1 was the insurance or financial industry, 19 or 4.9% were technical professionals or scientists, 47 or 12.2% were in education and 244 or 63.4% were in health care.

In 2000, there were 572 workers who commuted into the municipality and 597 workers who commuted away. The municipality is a net exporter of workers, with about 1.0 workers leaving the municipality for every one entering. About 18.5% of the workforce coming into Genolier are coming from outside Switzerland. Of the working population, 15.2% used public transportation to get to work, and 71.2% used a private car.

== Religion ==
From the 2000 census, 361 or 24.2% were Roman Catholic, while 604 or 40.4% belonged to the Swiss Reformed Church. Of the rest of the population, there were 11 members of an Orthodox church (or about 0.74% of the population), there were 4 individuals (or about 0.27% of the population) who belonged to the Christian Catholic Church, and there were 93 individuals (or about 6.22% of the population) who belonged to another Christian church. There were 3 individuals (or about 0.20% of the population) who were Jewish, and 16 (or about 1.07% of the population) who were Islamic. There were 3 individuals who were Buddhist, 4 individuals who were Hindu and 1 individual who belonged to another church. 352 (or about 23.56% of the population) belonged to no church, are agnostic or atheist, and 75 individuals (or about 5.02% of the population) did not answer the question.

== Education ==
In Genolier about 482 or (32.3%) of the population have completed non-mandatory upper secondary education, and 423 or (28.3%) have completed additional higher education (either university or a Fachhochschule). Of the 423 who completed tertiary schooling, 45.4% were Swiss men, 26.2% were Swiss women, 16.1% were non-Swiss men and 12.3% were non-Swiss women.

In the 2009/2010 school year there were a total of 245 students in the Genolier school district. In the Vaud cantonal school system, two years of non-obligatory pre-school are provided by the political districts. During the school year, the political district provided pre-school care for a total of 1,249 children of which 563 children (45.1%) received subsidized pre-school care. The canton's primary school program requires students to attend for four years. There were 110 students in the municipal primary school program. The obligatory lower secondary school program lasts for six years and there were 133 students in those schools. There were also 2 students who were home schooled or attended another non-traditional school.

As of 2000, there were 285 students in Genolier who came from another municipality, while 214 residents attended schools outside the municipality.

== Transportation ==
It is served by the NStCM Train. The bottom of the village along the road to Duillier is accessible from the bus stop "Mimorey". This stop is situated at the border with the municipalities of Coinsins, Duillier and Givrins.
