= Arzier-Le Muids =

- Municipality
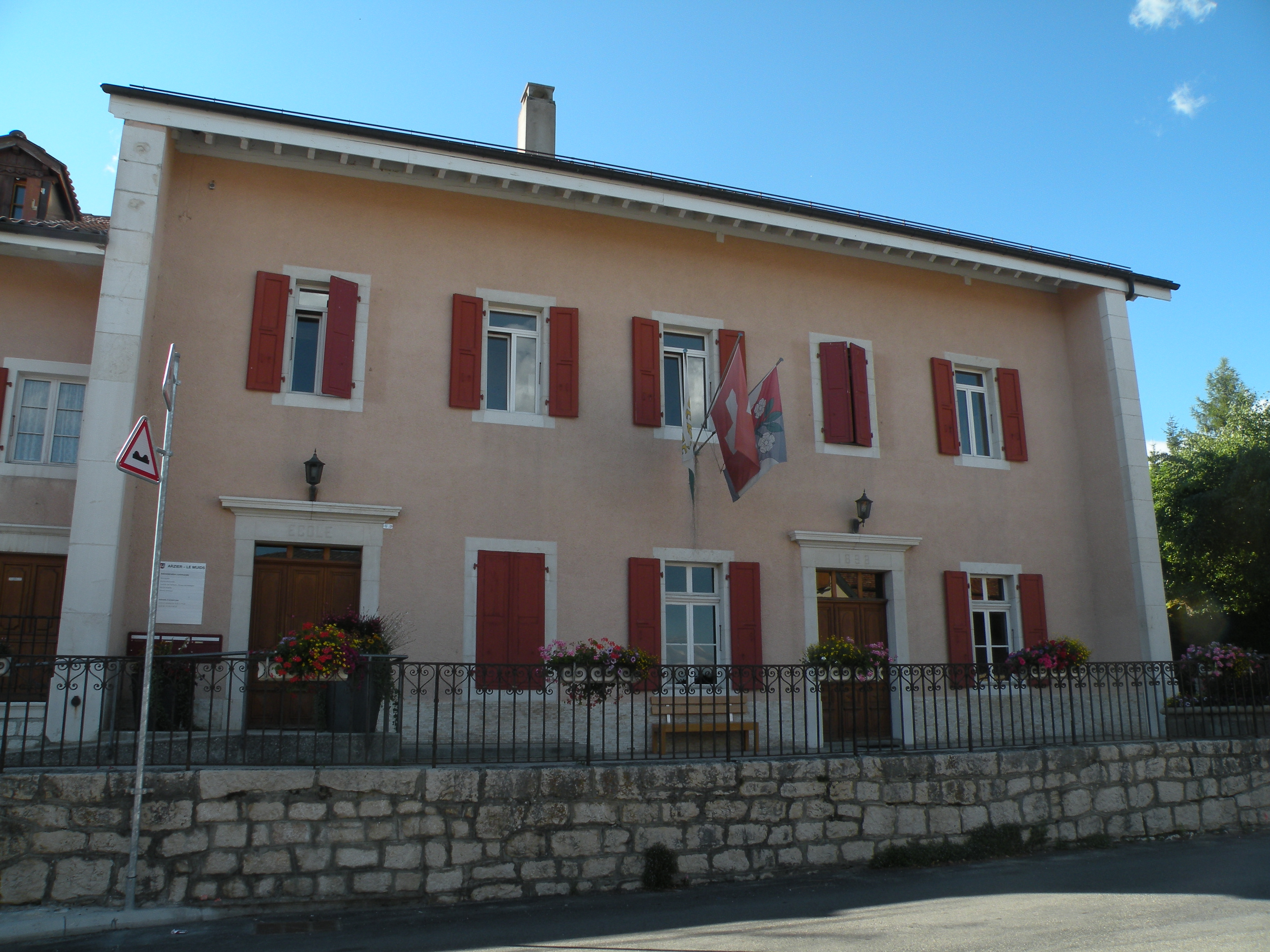
- Arzier village administration building

- Flag Coat of arms
- Location of Arzier-Le Muids
- Location within Switzerland Location within Canton of Vaud
- Coordinates: 46°28′N 6°13′E
- Country: Switzerland
- Canton: Vaud
- District: Nyon

Government
  - Mayor: Syndic; Louise Schweizer (as of 2016)

Area
  - Total: 51.89 km^{2} (20.03 sq mi)
- Elevation: 870 m (2,850 ft)

Population (2007)
  - Total: 2,003
  - Density: 38.60/km^{2} (99.98/sq mi)
- Time zone: UTC+01:00 (CET)
  - Summer (DST): UTC+02:00 (CEST)
- Postal code: 1273
- SFOS number: 5702
- ISO 3166 code: CH-VD
- Surrounded by: Bassins, Bois-d'Amont (FR-39), Genolier, Givrins, Le Chenit, Les Rousses (FR-39), Saint-Cergue, Begnins, Vich
- Website: www.arzier.ch

Arzier-Le Muids (French pronunciation: [aʁzje l(ə) mɥi]) is a municipality in the district of Nyon in the canton of Vaud in Switzerland. It is on the French border, neighbouring the Jura department.

== History ==
Aerial view (1964)

The first mention of Arzier was in 1306 as the village Argie. Throughout the Middle Ages Arzier's name is seen in documents as Arsie, Argier, and Arsier. Le Muids is first mentioned as a barn (dependent upon the abbey of Oujon) in 1250. Settlers were granted land (for farming) in Arzier by the abbey of Oujon in 1304. In 1536 control of the region, and of all of the lands of the abbey were lost to a conquering duke from Bern. This duke wasn't appreciated because he did not let each village govern itself, causing numerous problems and much discontent. Less than a century had past before the Brennards and Rafi lost their patience and stopped farming altogether, descending into extreme poverty. As time went by and the land went to waste, the regional government decided to take drastic measures, and in 1664, granted Arzier political independence. The village still had to pay a tax to Nyon, but henceforth it managed its own affairs independently. This is seen as the beginning of Arzier's prosperity.

In the early days of independence, the local council was composed of 8 members, each elected for life terms. Half came from Arzier, the other half from Le Muids. Today the political structure is much more complex, with the executive branch being made up of a mayor (syndic), a vice-mayor (vice-syndic) and three ministers (municipaux), and the legislative being made up of a council of a president, two vice presidents and 52 general members.

== Geography ==
Arzier has an area, as of 2009, of 51.9 square kilometers (20.0 mi^{2}). Of this area, 13.11 km^{2} (5.06 mi^{2}) or 25.3% is used for agricultural purposes, while 36.86 km^{2} (14.23 mi^{2}) or 71.0% is forested. Of the rest of the land, 1.61 km^{2} (0.62 mi^{2}) or 3.1% is settled (buildings or roads), 0.01 km^{2} (2.5 acres) or 0.0% is either rivers or lakes and 0.26 km^{2} (0.10 mi^{2}) or 0.5% is unproductive land.

Of the built up area, housing and buildings made up 1.8% and transportation infrastructure made up 1.1%. Out of the forested land, 67.1% of the total land area is heavily forested and 3.9% is covered with orchards or small clusters of trees. Of the agricultural land, 3.1% is used for growing crops and 1.6% is pastures and 20.4% is used for alpine pastures. All the water in the municipality is flowing water.

The municipality was part of the old Nyon District until it was dissolved on 31 August 2006, and Arzier became part of the new district of Nyon.

The official name of the municipality was "Arzier", and has been officially changed to "Arzier-Le Muids" in September 2013. The name is a mix of two villages, Arzier and Le Muids and the hamlet of Montant and La Chèvrerie. Le Muids (altitude : 695 m (2,280 ft)) is a small village which, due to its small size and proximity to Arzier (altitude : about 800 m (2,600 ft)) is part of the same municipality as its larger neighbor. Arzier natives are called "Brennards" because the village experienced a severe fire in its early days (derivative of French for burn "bruler"). Residents of Le Muids are called "Rafi."

== Coat of arms ==
The blazon of the municipal coat of arms is Per pale Gules and Azure, overall a branch Vert with three leaves and two roses Argent, from dexter and sinister a cloud of the last from each issuing hand of the same clothed Or shaking the other one.

== Demographics ==
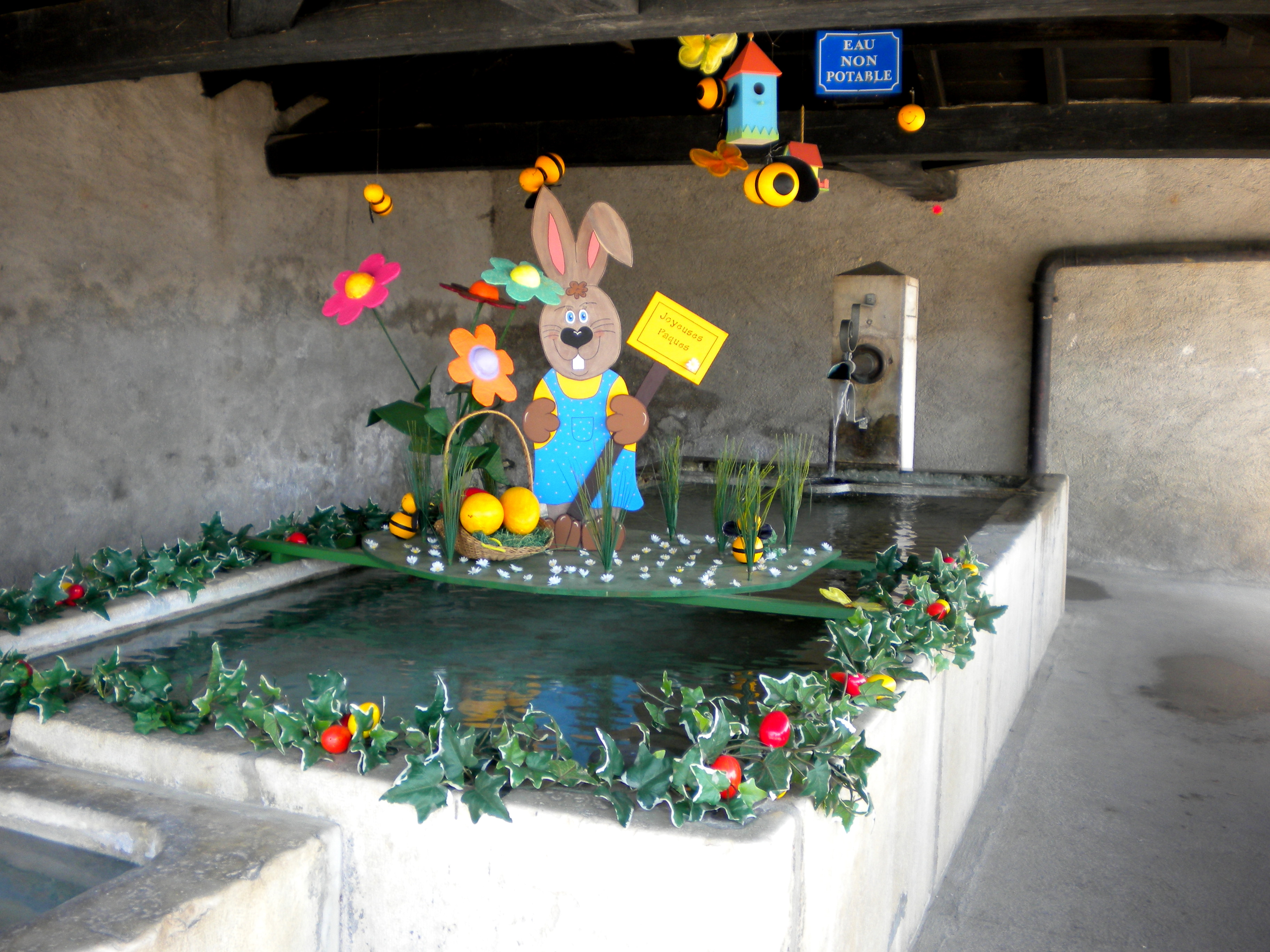
Easter decorations in the town fountain

Arzier has a population (as of December 2020) of 2,916. As of 2008, 25.6% of the population are resident foreign nationals. Over the last 10 years (1999–2009 ) the population has changed at a rate of 24.4%. It has changed at a rate of 18% due to migration and at a rate of 6.5% due to births and deaths.

Most of the population (as of 2000) speaks French (1,421 or 78.5%), with German being second most common (144 or 8.0%) and English being third (124 or 6.8%). There are 23 people who speak Italian and 1 person who speaks Romansh.

The age distribution, as of 2009, in Arzier is; 261 children or 12.0% of the population are between 0 and 9 years old and 371 teenagers or 17.0% are between 10 and 19. Of the adult population, 169 people or 7.8% of the population are between 20 and 29 years old. 259 people or 11.9% are between 30 and 39, 406 people or 18.6% are between 40 and 49, and 327 people or 15.0% are between 50 and 59. The senior population distribution is 237 people or 10.9% of the population are between 60 and 69 years old, 83 people or 3.8% are between 70 and 79, there are 49 people or 2.2% who are between 80 and 89, and there are 16 people or 0.7% who are 90 and older.

As of 2000, there were 758 people who were single and never married in the municipality. There were 894 married individuals, 62 widows or widowers and 97 individuals who are divorced.

As of 2000, there were 655 private households in the municipality, and an average of 2.6 persons per household. There were 158 households that consist of only one person and 62 households with five or more people. Out of a total of 679 households that answered this question, 23.3% were households made up of just one person and there were 3 adults who lived with their parents. Of the rest of the households, there are 188 married couples without children, 242 married couples with children There were 49 single parents with a child or children. There were 15 households that were made up of unrelated people and 24 households that were made up of some sort of institution or another collective housing.

In 2000 there were 518 single family homes (or 81.8% of the total) out of a total of 633 inhabited buildings. There were 64 multi-family buildings (10.1%), along with 33 multi-purpose buildings that were mostly used for housing (5.2%) and 18 other use buildings (commercial or industrial) that also had some housing (2.8%). Of the single family homes 28 were built before 1919, while 62 were built between 1990 and 2000. The greatest number of single family homes (137) were built between 1971 and 1980. The most multi-family homes (16) were built before 1919 and the next most (14) were built between 1981 and 1990. There were 5 multi-family houses built between 1996 and 2000.

In 2000, a total of 629 apartments (73.1% of the total) were permanently occupied, while 203 apartments (23.6%) were seasonally occupied and 28 apartments (3.3%) were empty. As of 2009, the construction rate of new housing units was 5.8 new units per 1000 residents. The vacancy rate for the municipality, in 2010, was 0%.

The historical population is given in the following chart:

== Heritage sites of national significance ==
The Oujon Charterhouse along with the House Basse is listed as a Swiss heritage site of national significance.

== Politics ==
In the 2007 federal election the most popular party was the SVP which received 27.51% of the vote. The next three most popular parties were the SP (15.36%), the Green Party (14.05%) and the FDP (12.69%). In the federal election, a total of 541 votes were cast, and the voter turnout was 45.6%.

== Transport ==
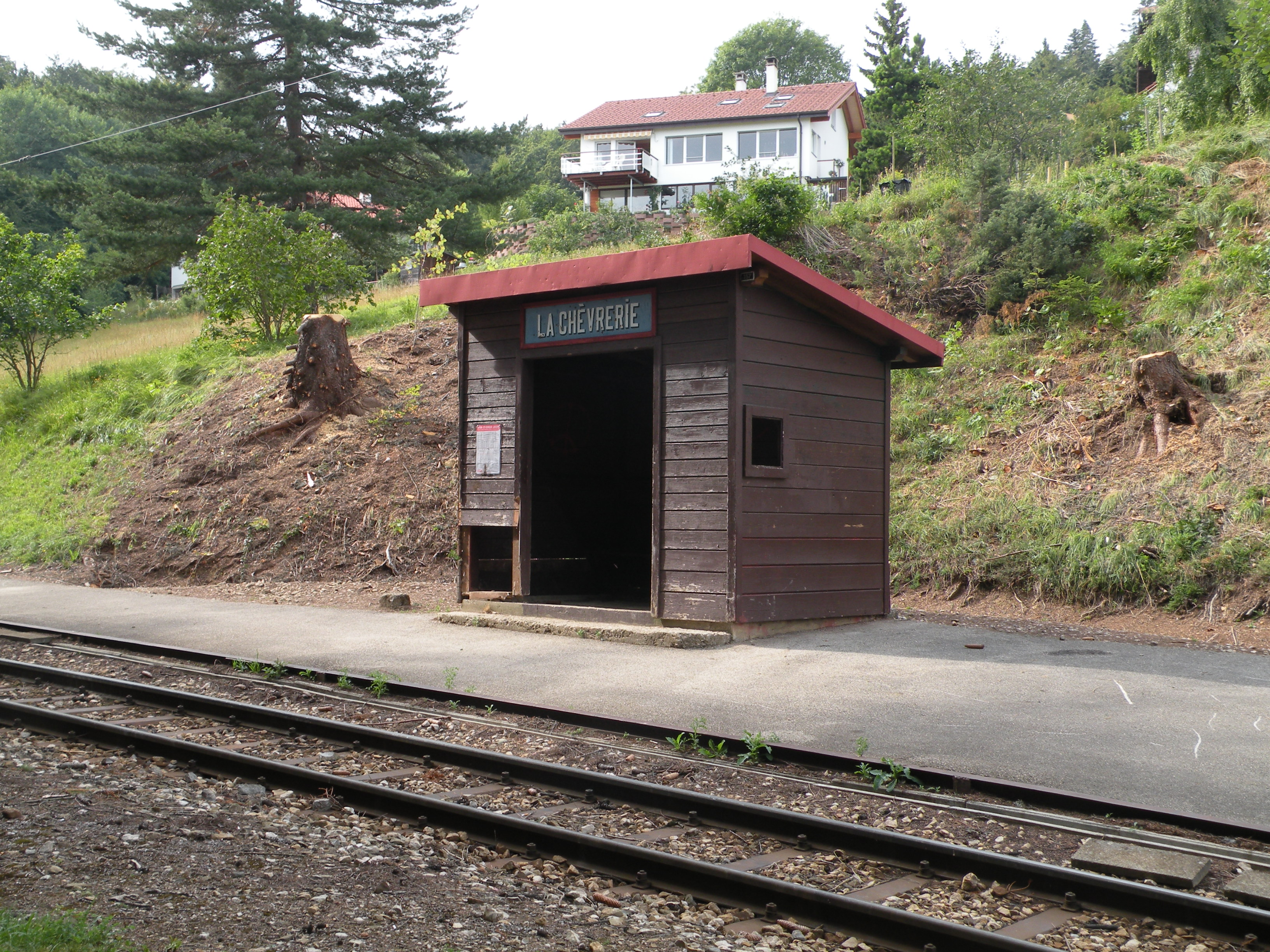
La Chèvrerie station in Arzier

It is served by the NStCM Train. The station has a siding where the 2 trains cross.

== Economy ==
As of 2010, Arzier had an unemployment rate of 4.5%. As of 2008, there were 25 people employed in the primary economic sector and about 10 businesses involved in this sector. 16 people were employed in the secondary sector and there were 5 businesses in this sector. 156 people were employed in the tertiary sector, with 54 businesses in this sector. There were 905 residents of the municipality who were employed in some capacity, of which females made up 41.7% of the workforce.

In 2008 the total number of full-time equivalent jobs was 160. The number of jobs in the primary sector was 19, of which 12 were in agriculture and 6 were in forestry or lumber production. The number of jobs in the secondary sector was 15 of which 13 or (86.7%) were in manufacturing and 2 (13.3%) were in construction. The number of jobs in the tertiary sector was 126. In the tertiary sector; 21 or 16.7% were in wholesale or retail sales or the repair of motor vehicles, 16 or 12.7% were in the movement and storage of goods, 7 or 5.6% were in a hotel or restaurant, 4 or 3.2% were in the information industry, 3 or 2.4% were the insurance or financial industry, 33 or 26.2% were technical professionals or scientists, 11 or 8.7% were in education and 5 or 4.0% were in health care.

The communal tax rate in Arzier le Muids is 64% of the cantonal tax rate. The commune does not have any competent authority for tax reclamation, billing issues and property gains, these roles are taken over by the Rolle-Nyon district tax office.

In 2000, there were 111 workers who commuted into the municipality and 737 workers who commuted away. The municipality is a net exporter of workers, with about 6.6 workers leaving the municipality for every one entering. About 22.5% of the workforce coming into Arzier are coming from outside Switzerland. Of the working population, 15.9% used public transportation to get to work, and 69.2% used a private car.

== Religion ==
From the 2000 census, 513 or 28.3% were Roman Catholic, while 700 or 38.7% belonged to the Swiss Reformed Church. Of the rest of the population, there were 20 members of an Orthodox church (or about 1.10% of the population), and there were 103 individuals (or about 5.69% of the population) who belonged to another Christian church. There were 2 individuals (or about 0.11% of the population) who were Jewish, and 6 (or about 0.33% of the population) who were Islamic. There were 4 individuals who were Buddhist and 3 individuals who belonged to another church. 406 (or about 22.42% of the population) belonged to no church, are agnostic or atheist, and 100 individuals (or about 5.52% of the population) did not answer the question.

== Education ==
In Arzier about 585 or (32.3%) of the population have completed non-mandatory upper secondary education, and 404 or (22.3%) have completed additional higher education (either university or a Fachhochschule). Of the 404 who completed tertiary schooling, 43.8% were Swiss men, 22.5% were Swiss women, 18.6% were non-Swiss men and 15.1% were non-Swiss women.

In the 2009/2010 school year there were a total of 291 students in the Arzier school district. In the Vaud cantonal school system, two years of non-obligatory pre-school are provided by the political districts. During the school year, the political district provided pre-school care for a total of 1,249 children of which 563 children (45.1%) received subsidized pre-school care. The canton's primary school program requires students to attend for four years. There were 152 students in the municipal primary school program. The obligatory lower secondary school program lasts for six years and there were 137 students in those schools. There were also 2 students who were home schooled or attended another non-traditional school.

As of 2000, there were 232 students from Arzier who attended schools outside the municipality.
