= St-Cergue railway station =

Railway station in Saint-Cergue, Switzerland

St-Cergue
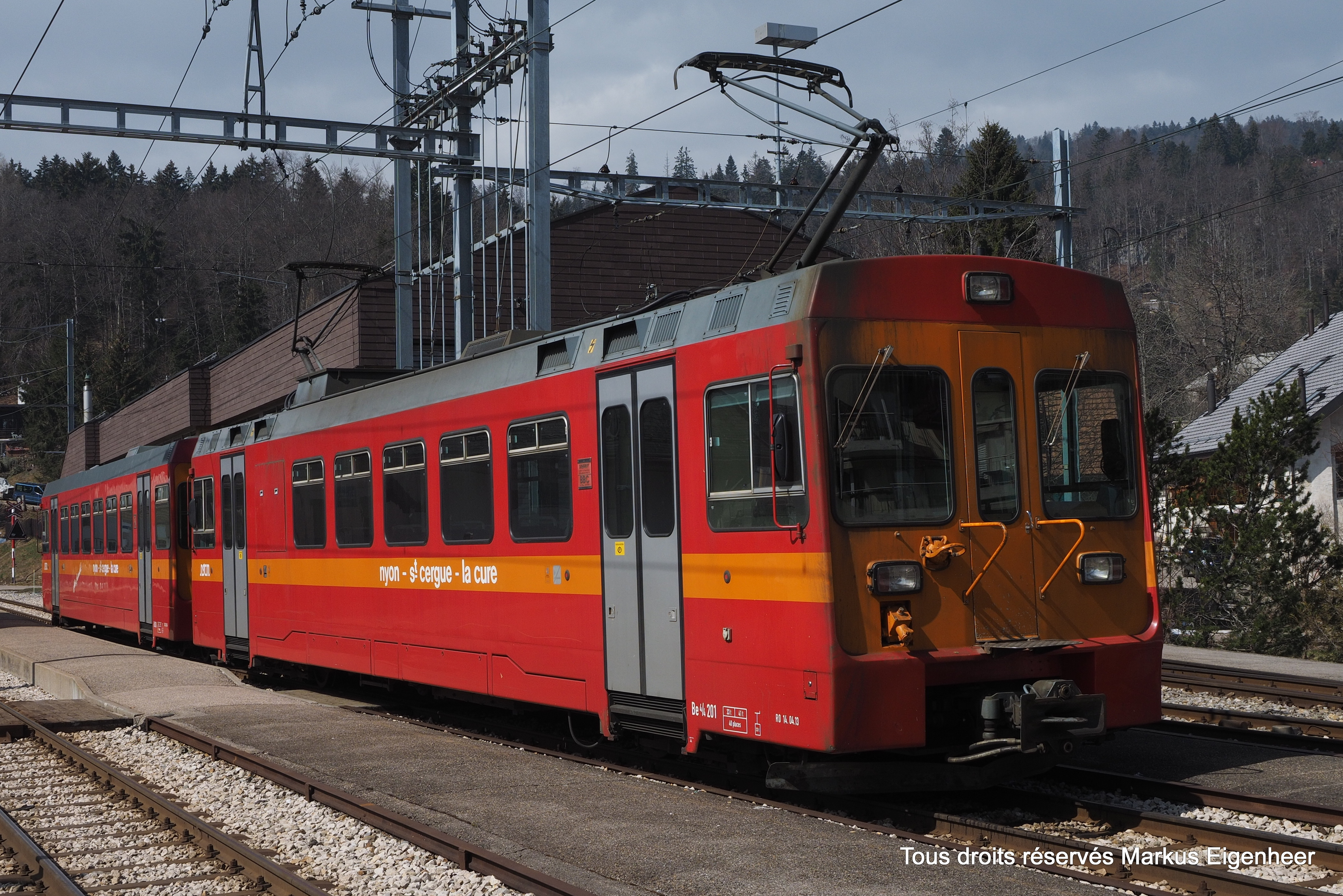
- A train at the station in 2015

General information
- Location: Saint-Cergue, Vaud; Switzerland
- Coordinates: 46°26′56″N 6°09′36″E
- Elevation: 1,047 m (3,435 ft)
- Owner: Chemin de fer Nyon–St-Cergue–Morez
- Line: Nyon–St-Cergue–Morez line
- Distance: 19.1 km (11.9 mi) from Nyon
- Platforms: 2
- Tracks: 2
- Train operators: Chemin de fer Nyon–St-Cergue–Morez

Construction
- Accessible: No

Other information
- Station code: 8501062 (STCE)
- Fare zone: 94 (mobilis)

History
- Opened: 12 July 1916

Services
Preceding station	NStCM	Following station
St-Cergue Les Cheseaux towards La Cure	R55	La Chèvrerie-Monterêt towards Nyon
Terminus	R55	La Chèvrerie-Monterêt towards Nyon
Location

St-Cergue railway station (French: Gare de Saint-Cergue), is a railway station in the municipality of Saint-Cergue, in the Swiss canton of Vaud. It is an intermediate stop on the 1,000 mm (3 ft 3 3/8 in) metre gauge Nyon–St-Cergue–Morez line of Chemin de fer Nyon–St-Cergue–Morez.

== Services ==
As of the December 2023 timetable change, the following services stop at St-Cergue:

- Regio: half-hourly service to Nyon and hourly service to La Cure.

== Bibliography ==
- Wägli, Hans G.; Jacobi, Sébastien (2010). Schienennetz Schweiz - Bahnprofil Schweiz CH+ [Swiss rail network] (in German) (3rd ed.). Zürich: AS Verlag. ISBN 978-3-909111-74-9.
