= Nyon railway station =

Railway station in Nyon, Switzerland

Nyon
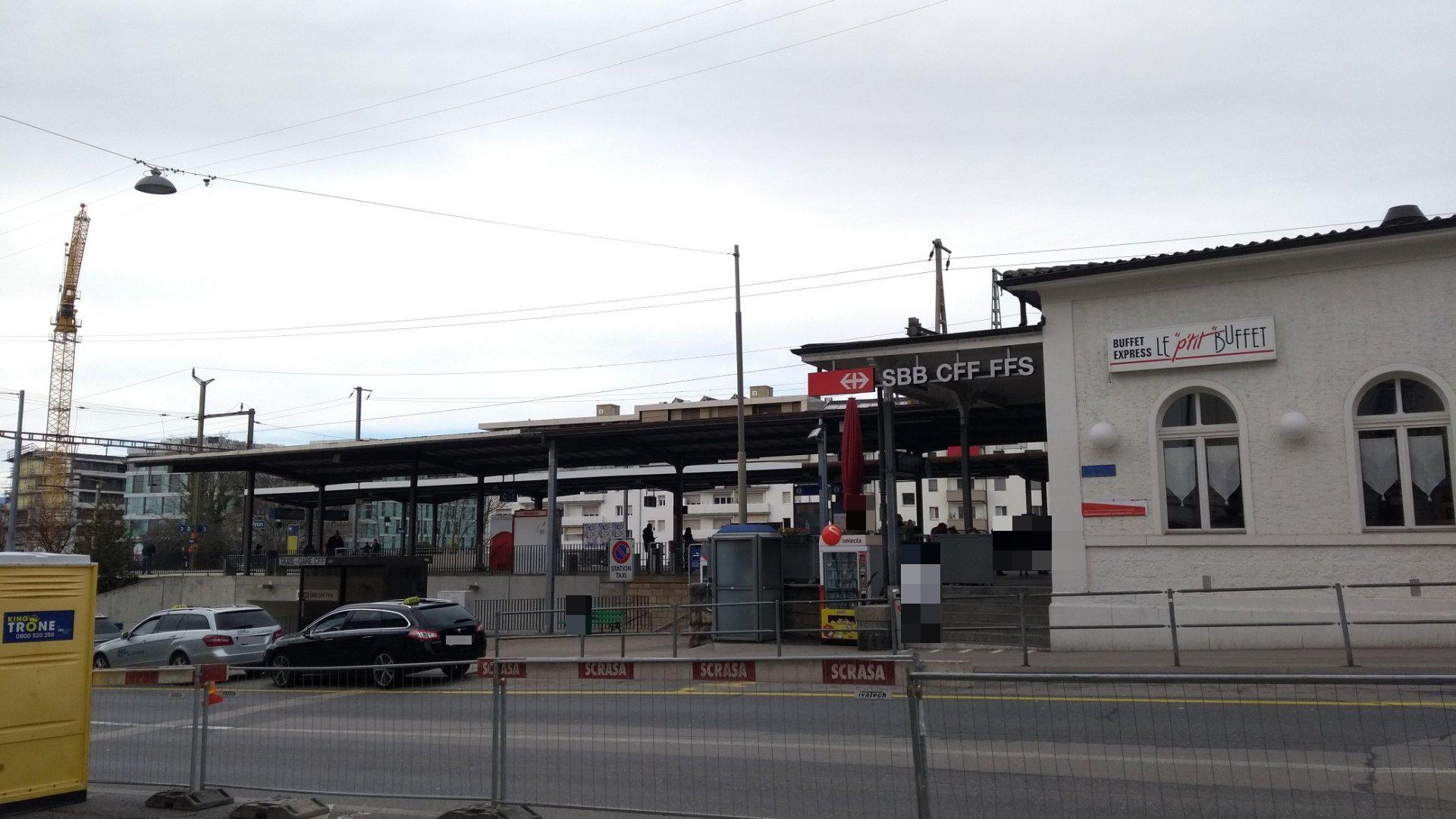
- The station platform in 2018

General information
- Location: Nyon; Switzerland
- Coordinates: 46°23′04″N 6°14′10″E
- Elevation: 405 m (1,329 ft)
- Owner: Swiss Federal Railways
- Lines: Lausanne–Geneva line; Nyon–St-Cergue–Morez line
- Distance: 38.5 km (23.9 mi) from Lausanne
- Platforms: 2 island platforms; 1 side platform
- Tracks: 5
- Train operators: Chemin de fer Nyon–St-Cergue–Morez; Swiss Federal Railways
- Connections: CarPostal SA; TPN

Construction
- Parking: Yes (101 spaces)
- Cycle facilities: Yes (137 spaces)
- Accessible: Yes

Other information
- Station code: 8501030 (NY)
- Fare zone: 20 (mobilis)

Passengers
- 2025: 19,300 per day (SBB)
- Rank: 39 out of 1,095 (Note: Tied with Yverdon-les-Bains railway station.)

Services
Preceding station	SBB CFF FFS	Following station
Genève-Cornavin towards Geneva Airport	IR 15	Morges towards Lucerne
Genève-Cornavin towards Geneva Airport	IR 57	Gland towards Neuchâtel
Genève-Cornavin towards Geneva Airport	IR 95	Morges towards Brig
Coppet towards Annemasse or Geneva Airport	RE33	Gland towards St-Maurice or Martigny
Preceding station	NStCM	Following station
Les Plantaz towards Genolier, St-Cergue or La Cure	R55	Terminus
Location
- Location within Switzerland Location within Canton of Vaud

Nyon railway station (French: Gare de Nyon) is a railway station in the municipality of Nyon, in the Swiss canton of Vaud. It is an intermediate stop on the standard gauge Lausanne–Geneva line of Swiss Federal Railways and the southern terminus of the 1,000 mm (3 ft 3 3/8 in) metre gauge Nyon–St-Cergue–Morez line of the Chemin de fer Nyon–St-Cergue–Morez.

== Layout and connections ==
The Lausanne–Geneva line has three tracks (Nos. 1–3) served by a side platform and an island platform. An island platform for the 1,000 mm (3 ft 3 3/8 in) gauge Nyon–St-Cergue–Morez line is located underground, beneath the Route St-Cergue. This platform has two tracks, Nos. 21–22. CarPostal Suisse and Transports publics de la région nyonnaise (TPN) operate bus services from the station.

== Services ==
As of the December 2024 timetable change, the following services stop at Nyon:

- InterRegio:
  - hourly service between Geneva Airport and Brig.
  - hourly service between Geneva Airport and Lucerne.
  - limited service between Geneva Airport and Neuchâtel.
- RegioExpress: half-hourly service (hourly on weekends) between Annemasse and St-Maurice, and hourly service from St-Maurice to Martigny. On weekends, hourly service to Geneva Airport.
- Regio: service every 15 minutes to Genolier on weekdays, half-hourly service to St-Cergue, with every other train continuing from St-Cergue to La Cure.
