= Communauté tarifaire vaudoise =

The Communauté tarifaire vaudoise, also known by its marketing name mobilis, is a Swiss tariff network covering the whole of the canton of Vaud.
