= Nyon–St-Cergue–Morez Railway =

Narrow gauge railway line in western Switzerland

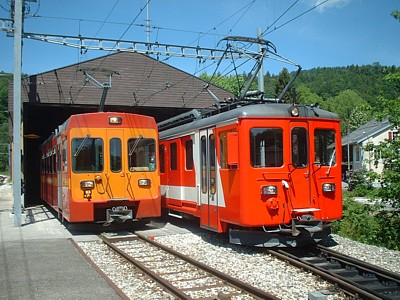

Overview
- Native name: Chemin de fer Nyon–Saint-Cergue–Morez
- Locale: Vaud, Switzerland
- Termini: La Cure, Nyon
- Stations: 17

Service
- Type: Commuter rail
- Services: 1

History
- Opened: 1916

Technical
- Line length: 26.70 km (16.59 mi)
- Number of tracks: 1
- Track gauge: 1,000 mm (3 ft 3 3/8 in) metre gauge
- Electrification: Overhead lines, 1500 V DC (since 1985)
- Operating speed: 60 km/h (37 mph)
- Highest elevation: 1,232 m (4,042 ft)

The Nyon–St-Cergue–Morez Railway (NStCM; French: Chemin de fer Nyon–Saint-Cergue–Morez) is a narrow gauge railway in western Switzerland which nowadays operates between Nyon, on the northern shore of Lake Geneva and the French border at La Cure, the La Cure–Morez section having closed in 1958. The railway reaches a height of 1,228 metres (4,029 feet) above sea level at the Col de la Givrine and it is the highest in the Jura Mountains.

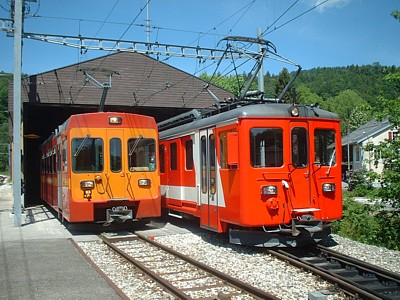
Railcars on shed: ACMV/BBC Type Be4/4 205 in 'new livery' (left) alongside SWS/SAAS Type BDe4/4 231 ex-CJ No.606, photographed at Saint-Cergue.

== History ==
The line, built to 1,000 mm (3 ft 3 3/8 in) gauge, was opened in three sections, the first from Nyon, a town on the shores of Lake Geneva, to the Jura Mountains resort village of Saint-Cergue on 12 July 1916, then to the French border at La Cure, opened on 18 August 1917. The third section, built by the French Company Chemins de fer électriques du Jura (CFEJ), taking the line over the border was opened to the French town of Morez on 7 March 1921 giving a total length of 39 km (24 mi). In effect, this small line linked the Swiss railways' main line from Geneva to Lausanne with that of the Chemins de fer de Paris à Lyon et à la Méditerranée (PLM) (from 1938 this was the SNCF). With the exception of the period from 1940 to 1948 this enabled direct services to operate on a daily basis, although wintertime conditions often made this a difficult feat. Because of its steep gradients the line was electrified from the outset at the unusual, if not unique, 2,200 Volts DC. The 12-kilometre (7.5 mi) French section from La Cure to Morez closed on 28 September 1958.

== The line ==
Originally the line commenced outside the main station in Nyon and after passing below the Swiss Federal Railways main line it climbed steadily, steeply in places taking large curves to ease the gradient, to the mountain resort of St. Cergue. From here it runs alongside the road through the Col de la Givrine, with a summit of 1,232 m (4,042 ft). Above sea level, to the village of La Cure, nowadays its upper terminus. It was here the line crossed the French border and again running alongside the road, passing the village of Les Rousses it duly arrived in the streets of Morez. The line then descended steeply to terminate in front of the PLM station.

== Locomotives and Rolling Stock ==
No.	Type	Seats: 2nd+1st	Builders Details	Date Built	Notes.
1	ABDe4/4	20+5	SWS/BBC	1916	Sold 1982, Chemin de fer de la Mure
2	ABDe4/4	30+6	CGV/BBC	1936	1961 ex-CFEJ No.2:Withdrawn 1986
3	ABDe4/4	18+6	D&B/BBC	1924	1961 ex-CFEJ No.1:Scrapped after accident 1980
5	ABDe4/4	20+5	SWS/BBC	1916	Sold 1986, Chemin de fer de la Mure
6	ABDe4/4	20+5	SWS/BBC	1916	Withdrawn 1983
10	ABDe4/4	10+5	SWS/BBC	1918	Sold 1992, Chemin de fer de la Mure
11	ABDe4/4	10+5	SWS/BBC	1918	Sold 1992, Chemin de fer de la Mure
201	Be4/4	40	ACMV/BBC	1985	
202	Be4/4	40	ACMV/BBC	1985	
203	Be4/4	40	ACMV/BBC	1985	
204	Be4/4	40	ACMV/BBC	1985	
205	Be4/4	40	ACMV/BBC	1986	
211	BDe4/4	24	ACMV/ABB	1991	baggage area but fewer seats
221	BDe4/4	40		1936	Ex-LEB No.22, 1991
231	BDe4/4	32	SWS/SAAS	1953	Ex-CJ No.606, 2003
232	BDe4/4	32	SWS/SAAS	1953	Ex-CJ No.607, 2007
251	XTm2/2		Beilhack/Deutz	1984	Fitted with Hiab lifting equipment.
261	Tm2/2		O&K/Deutz	1958	Type MV4A, Wks No.25845. Rebuilt 1996.
301	Bt	52	ACMV/BBC	1985	driving trailer
302	Bt	52	ACMV/BBC	1985	driving trailer
303	Bt	52	ACMV/BBC	1985	driving trailer
304	Bt	52	ACMV/BBC	1985	driving trailer
305	Bt	52	ACMV/BBC	1986	driving trailer
331	Bt	48	SIG/SAAS	1952	driving trailer, ex-CJ No.705
341	B	66	SWS	1949	ex BTI B41 in 1978 ex BD B41 in 1969
342	B	66	SWS	1949	ex BTI B42 in 1978 ex BD B42 in 1969
381	D		SWS	1913	ex-YSteC DZ 62 ex PTT (RhB) Z4° 76 ex 88 1955 rebuilt with bogies ex Z° 26 ex 321

- all motor coaches are double cab
- all driving trailers are single cab
- B 341-342 are MU-wired for push-pull operation with Be4/4 201–205, BDe4/4 211 and Bt 301–305

=== Abbreviations ===
- ACMV : Ateliers de constructions mécaniques de Vevey
- BBC : Brown, Boveri & Cie
- BD : Bremgarten-Dietikon Bahn
- BTI : Biel-Taufelen-Ins Bahn
- CJ : Chemins de fer du Jura
- LEB : Chemin de fer Lausanne-Echallens-Bercher
- RhB : Rhätische Bahn
- SAAS : S.A. Ateliers Sécheron, Geneva
- SWS : Schweizerische Wagons & Aufzügefabrik
- YSteC : Chemin de fer Yverdon – Ste. Croix

== Modernisation ==
The earliest section to open, that in Switzerland, continued after the closure of the French section and in the 1980s was part of a modernisation programme. The overline line voltage was changed from 2,200 Volts DC to the more common 1,500 Volts DC and automatic block signalling was installed. Work to modernise the infrastructure and implement the voltage change took place throughout 1984 and 1985. The St. Cergue–La Cure section was changed to the new, reduced voltage in mid-October 1985 and the Nyon–St. Cergue section followed on 5 December 1985. As part of this modernisation, new rolling stock was purchased, and arrived starting in autumn 1985. These were new automotrice (powered driving railcars) and matching voitures pilote (driving trailers). During the transitional phase in the line voltage, the old cars were able to continue in service after the reduction in voltage, but at reduced speed. The old stock ran for the last time on 20 December 1985, and from 21 December all service was operated by the new trains.

Plans were put forward in 1999 to extend the line some 2.5 km (1.6 mi) over the French border to the village of Les Rousses but this did not prove cost effective to the communities involved and was rejected. In 2004, the Nyon terminus was moved to a two platform underground station on the north side of the main line approached by escalators from the station underpass.

== Preservation ==
The original “automotrice”, of which 7 were built, were heavy duty vehicles and could haul several trailer cars. Two of these have survived, restored to working order, at the Chemin de Fer de la Mure near Grenoble. Two other examples were sold to the same railway but have yet to be restored. Some trailer cars have also survived including No. B7 which has been restored at the Blonay–Chamby museum railway near Montreux and another example at the Chemin de Fer Voies Ferrees du Velay in Haute Loire. The vehicles carried a dark red livery.

== Gallery ==
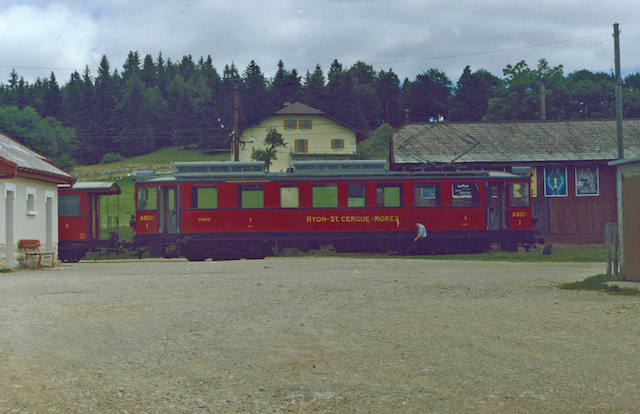
The terminus at La Cure in 1978

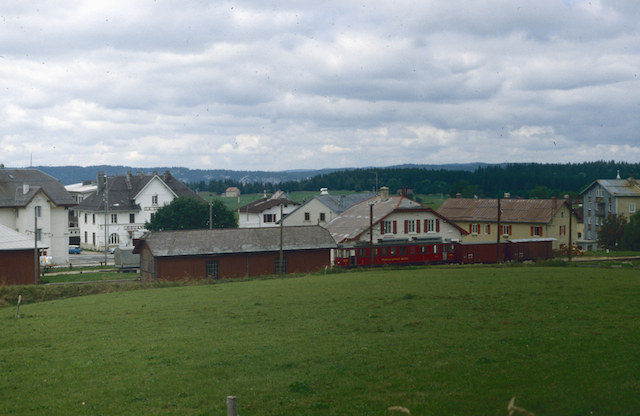
The Swiss-French border at La Cure

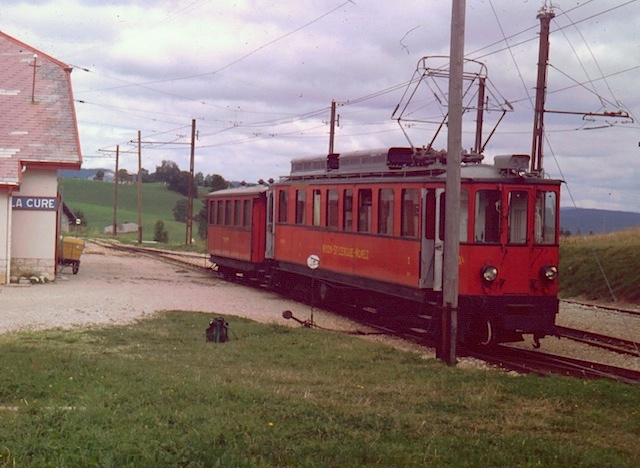
A motor car and trailer at La Cure

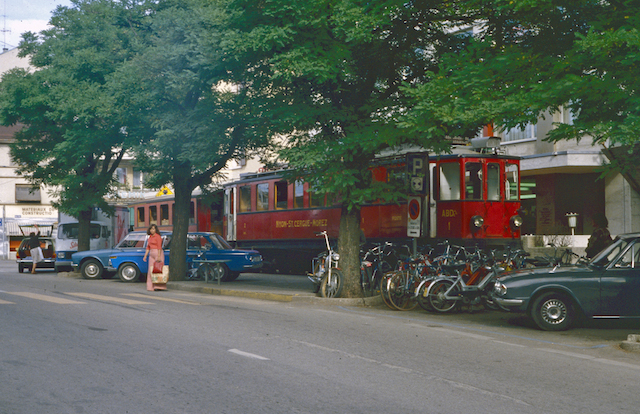
In 1979 NSCM trains waited in the street outside Nyon CFF station. This section has now been placed in tunnel.

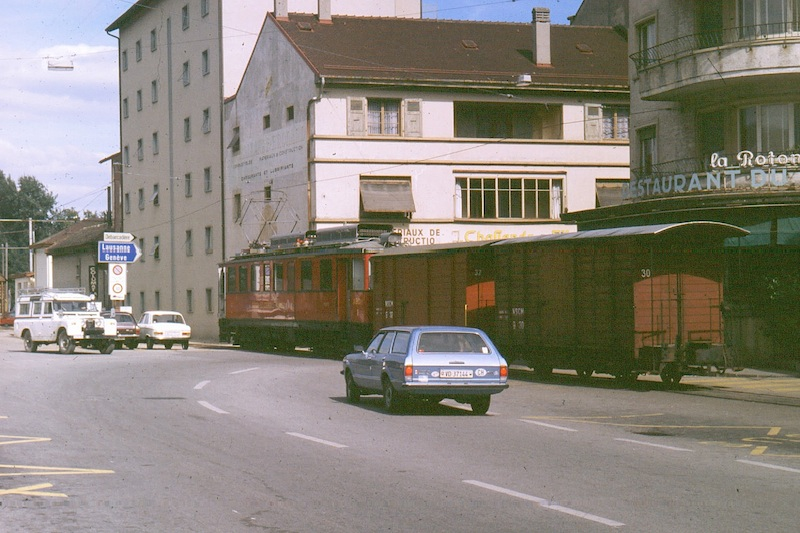
At Nyon in 1979 the narrow-gauge train hauls its load of vans to the CFF goods station.

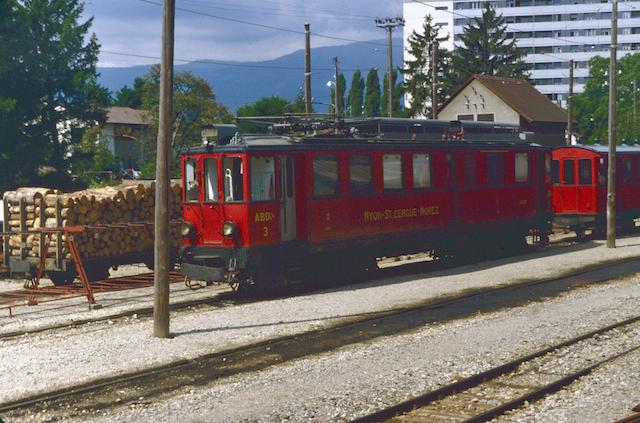
Timber for pit props was the main freight traffic in 1979.

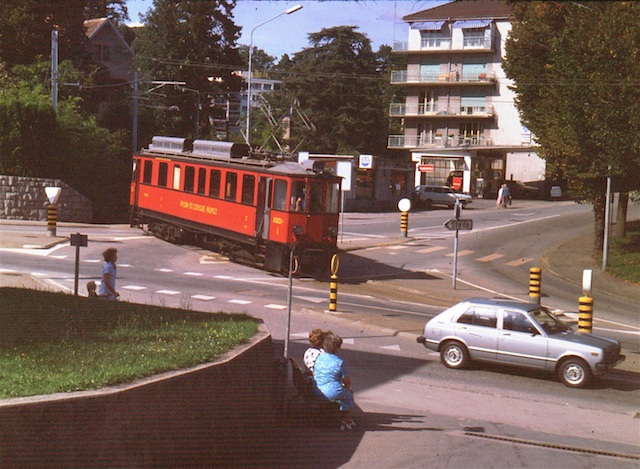
The La Cure trains originally left Nyon as a street tramway. This section has now been replaced by a tunnel.

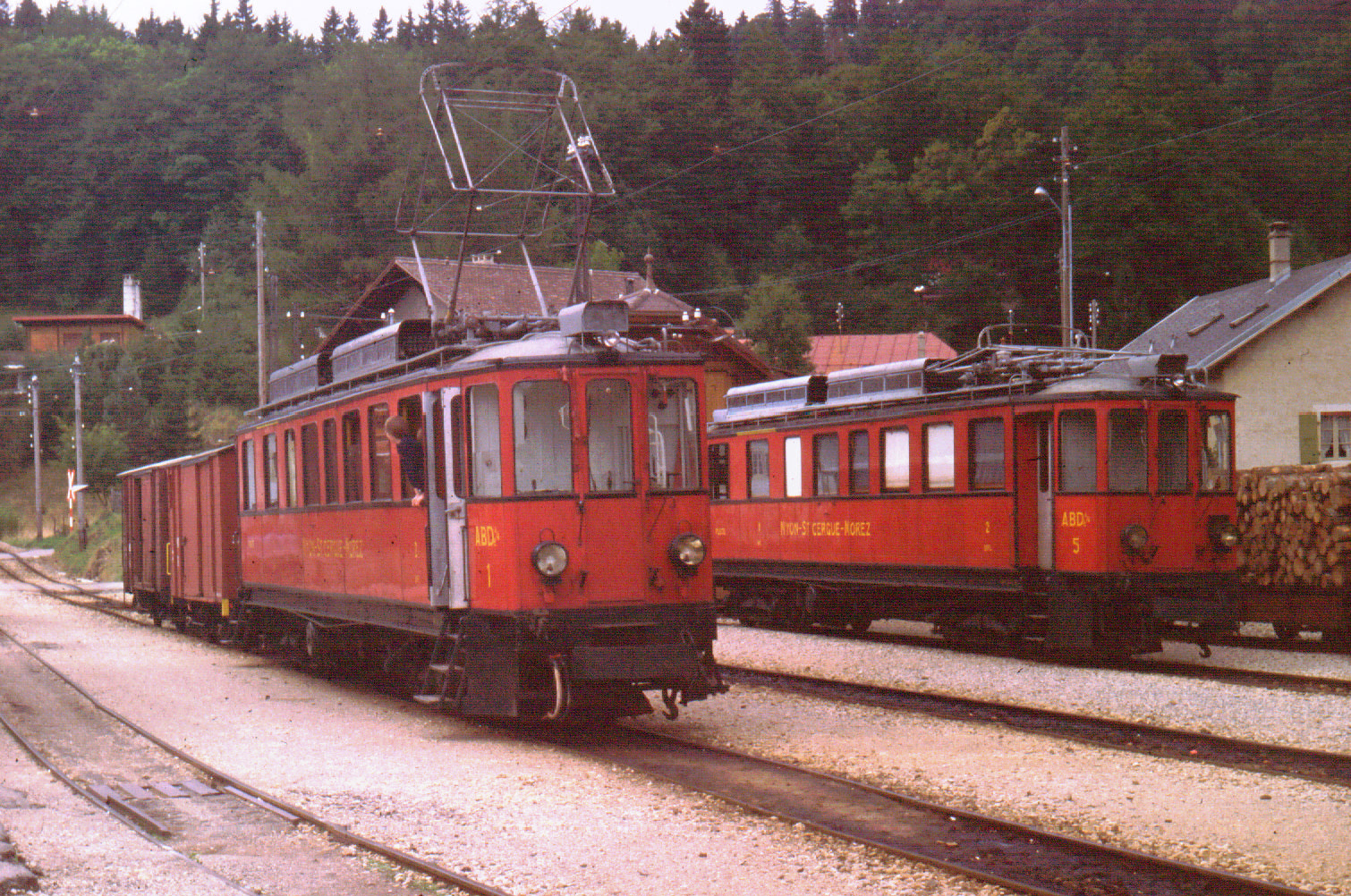
St Cergue was the main town on the NSCM route. Trains of 1914-16 motors pass in 1979.

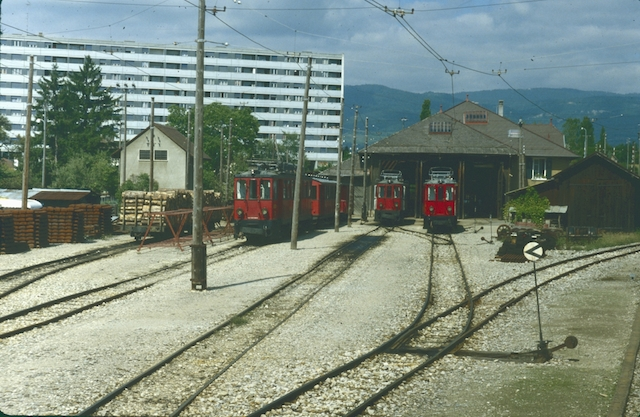
The main NSCM depot is on the edge of Nyon.

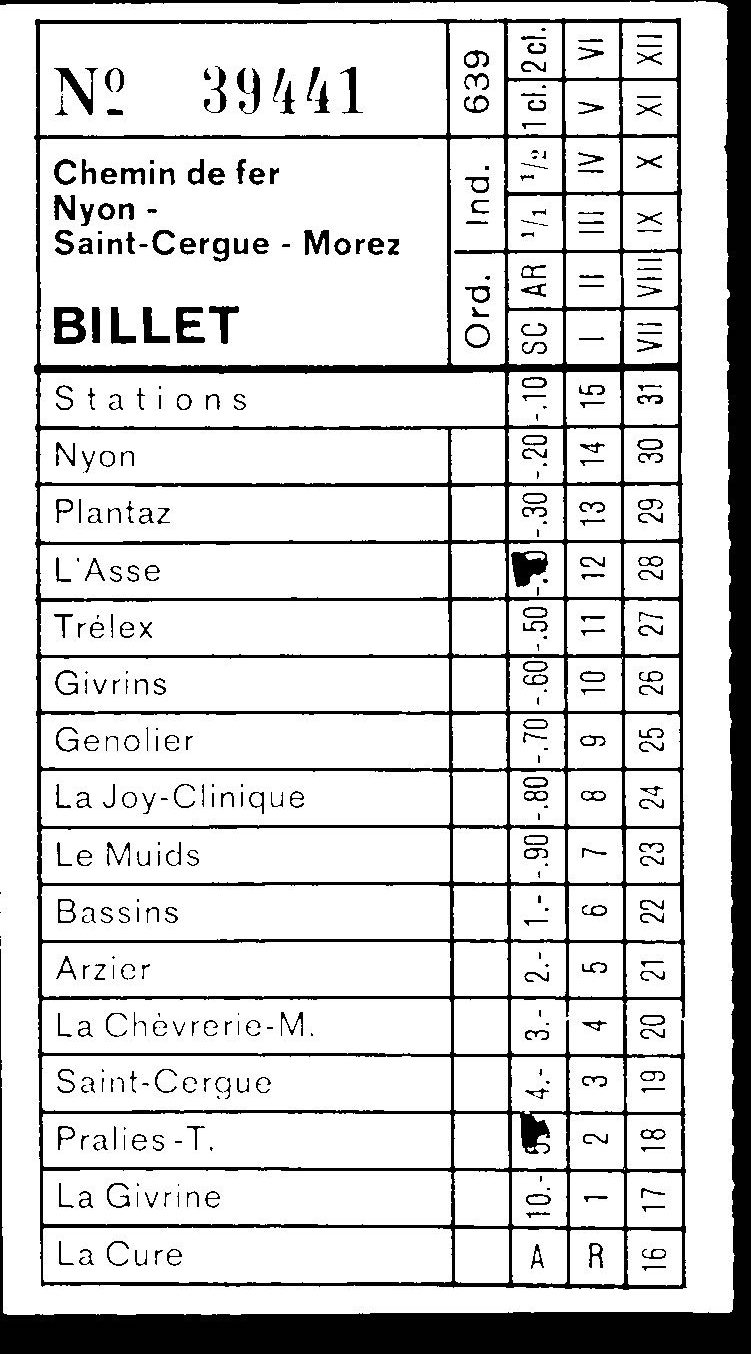
NSCM ticket
