= Piney Pinecreek Border Airport =

Piney Pinecreek Border Airport Pinecreek/Piney Pinecreek Border Aerodrome
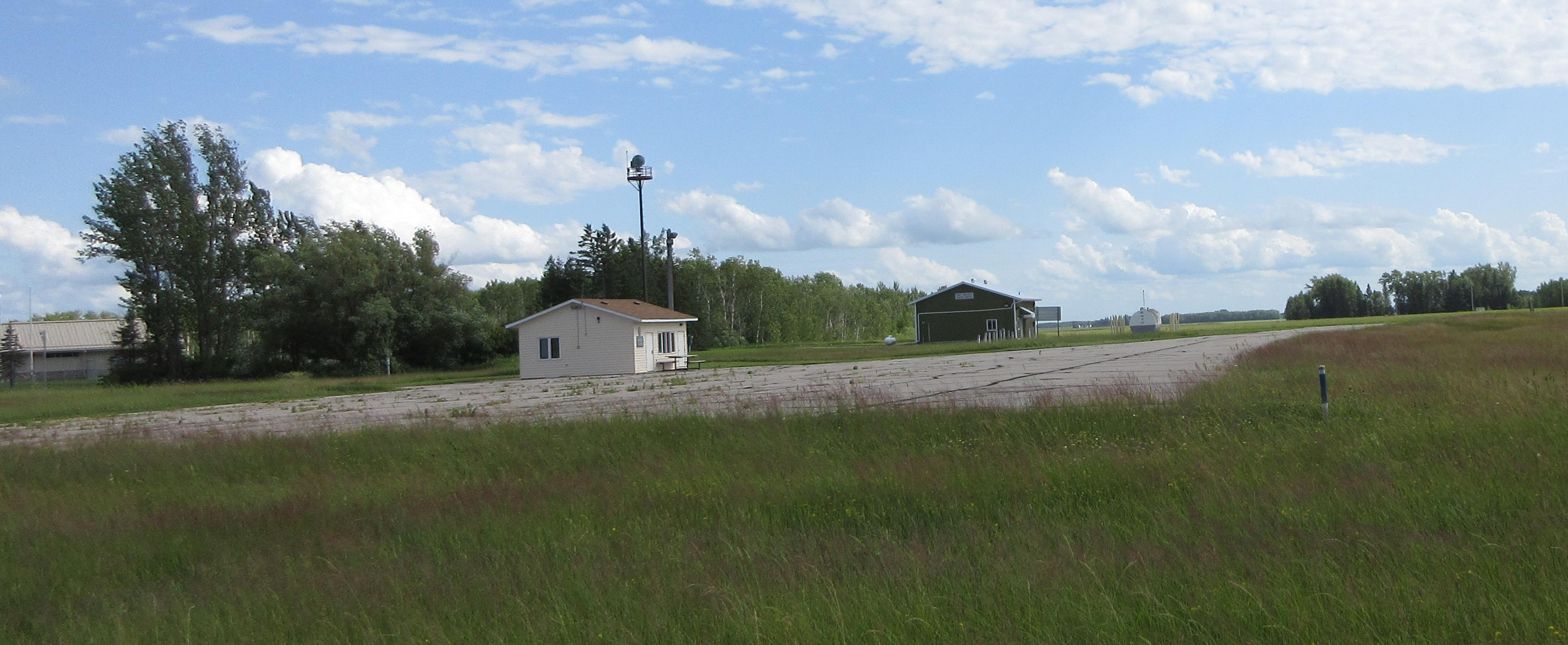
- Ramp facilities at Piney Pinecreek Border Airport. The left-hand building and ramp is north of the border in Canada; the right-hand building and ramp, in the United States.
- IATA: none; ICAO: K48Y; FAA LID: 48Y; TC LID: K48Y

Summary
- Airport type: Public
- Owner: Minnesota DOT and government of Piney, Manitoba
- Operator: Piney/Pinecreek Border Airport Commission
- Serves: Piney, Manitoba; Pinecreek, Minnesota
- Location: Canada–United States border
- Opened: July 29, 1953
- Closed: December 27, 2024
- Time zone: CST (UTC−06:00)
  - Summer (DST): CDT (UTC−05:00)
- Elevation AMSL: 1,082 ft (330 m)
- Coordinates: 48°59′56″N 095°58′56″W

Map
- Location in Minnesota/Manitoba 48Y (the United States)

Runways
Direction	Length		Surface
Direction	ft	m	Surface
15/33	3,297	1,005	Asphalt

Statistics (2008)
- Aircraft operations: 3,000
- Sources: Federal Aviation Administration and Canada Flight Supplement

Piney Pinecreek Border Airport (ICAO: K48Y, FAA LID: 48Y, TC LID: K48Y) was a public use general aviation airport located 2 nautical miles (3.7 km; 2.3 mi) northwest of the central business district of Pinecreek, in Dieter Township, Roseau County, Minnesota, United States, on the Canada–US border. It was jointly owned by the Minnesota Department of Transportation and the government of Piney, Manitoba. It was shared by the rural communities of Piney, Manitoba and Pinecreek, Minnesota.

Also known as Pinecreek/Piney Pinecreek Border Aerodrome, it was the easternmost of six airports that cross the Canada–US border. The other airports, east to west, are International Peace Garden Airport, Coronach/Scobey Border Station Airport, Coutts/Ross International Airport, Whetstone International Airport (Del Bonita/Whetstone International Airport), and Avey Field State Airport.

The airport was originally located entirely within the United States. Needing to extend the runway, the owners found it could not be extended south due to a nearby road, but the land to the immediate north was unused. After arrangements were made with Canadian and Manitoba authorities, the runway was extended across the 49th parallel. The initial and extended runways were turf but have since been paved.

The airport, located in Manitoba and Minnesota, had both United States and Canada customs services and was attractive to tourists, hunters and fishermen. Ground access was available on Manitoba Highway 89 and Minnesota State Highway 89.

The airport was classified as an airport of entry by Nav Canada and was staffed by the Canada Border Services Agency (CBSA). CBSA officers at this airport could handle general aviation aircraft only, with no more than 15 passengers.

The airport permanently closed on December 27, 2024 after a December 26 expiration of an international agreement.

== History ==
An airport for the town of Pinecreek was proposed by resident Eugene Simmons in 1949, to expedite cross-border general aviation traffic. The airport initially opened on July 29, 1953, with a runway terminating just before the international border. To allow operation of larger aircraft, a 1150-foot extension was proposed in 1972. However, this had to cross the Canada–US border and required extensive negotiation between local and national governments. The extended runway and bi-national airport was dedicated on July 28, 1978.

Citing declining usage and significant impending repair costs, it was announced that the airport was scheduled for permanent closure on December 27, 2024. Costs for runway resurfacing and other repairs required to bring the airport up to current safety standards were estimated at $3.8 million. As joint owner, the rural municipality of Piney, Manitoba was responsible for almost half of these costs, which they were unable to raise. Without funding for repairs, officials from both governments elected not to renew the international agreement required to continue airport operations past this date.

== Facilities and aircraft ==
Piney Pinecreek Border Airport covered an area of 61 acres (25 ha) at an elevation of 1,082 ft (330 m) above mean sea level. It had one asphalt paved runway designated 15/33 which measured 3297ft by 75ft.

For the 12-month period ending May 31, 2011, the airport had 3,000 general aviation aircraft operations, an average of 250 per month.

Two aprons allowed passengers to deplane in either country and walk to the respective customs authority. Pilots and passengers in Canada needed to walk across Provincial Trunk Route 89 to report to CBSA, while in the US, the border station was located on the airport side of Minnesota State Highway 89. Fuel tanks were located on the US side. Employees were allowed to cross into airport property located in the opposite country.

== See also ==
- List of airports in Minnesota
