= Whetstone International Airport =

Whetstone International Airport Del Bonita/Whetstone International Airport
- Airport sign with the runway in the background
- IATA: none; ICAO: none; FAA LID: H28; TC LID: CEQ4

Summary
- Airport type: Public
- Owner: State of Montana
- Operator: Montana DOT Aeronautics Division
- Serves: Port of Del Bonita, Montana; Del Bonita, Alberta
- Location: Canada–United States border
- Time zone: MST (UTC−07:00)
  - Summer (DST): MDT (UTC−06:00)
- Elevation AMSL: 4,336 ft (1,322 m)
- Coordinates: 48°59′55″N 112°46′35″W

Map
- Location on border of Montana and Alberta

Runways
Direction	Length		Surface
Direction	ft	m	Surface
7/25	4,440; 4,401	1,353; 1,341	Turf

Statistics (2009)
- Aircraft operations: 110
- Sources: Federal Aviation Administration and Canada Flight Supplement

Frank Whetstone International Airport or Del Bonita/Whetstone International Airport (FAA LID: H28, TC LID: CEQ4) is a public use airport at the Canada–US border, in Port of Del Bonita, Glacier County, Montana, 2 nautical miles (4 km; 2 mi) south of Del Bonita, Cardston County, Alberta. The airport is owned by the U.S. state of Montana and is operated by the Montana Department of Transportation Aeronautics Division. It is located 31 miles (50 km) northwest of the city of Cut Bank, Montana.

The airport has a runway located on the border, with aircraft tie down areas in Canada and in the United States. It is classified as an airport of entry by Nav Canada and is staffed by the Canada Border Services Agency (CBSA). CBSA officers at this airport can handle general aviation aircraft only, with no more than 15 passengers.

The airport is one of five airports that straddle the Canada–US border. The others are Avey Field State Airport, Coutts/Ross International Airport, International Peace Garden Airport and Coronach/Scobey Border Station Airport.

== Facilities and aircraft ==
The airport covers an area of 14 acres (6 ha) at an elevation of 4,336 ft (1,322 m) above mean sea level. It has one runway designated 7/25 with a turf surface which is 4,440 ft (1,353 m) or 4,401 ft (1,341 m) long and 65 ft (20 m) wide.

For the 12-month period ending April 27, 2016, the airport had 110 aircraft operations: 73% general aviation and 27% military.

== See also ==
- List of airports in Montana
- List of airports in Alberta
