= Coronach/Scobey Border Station Airport =

Aerodrome in Saskatchewan and Montana

Coronach/Scobey Border Station Airport Scobey Border Station Airport East Poplar International Airport
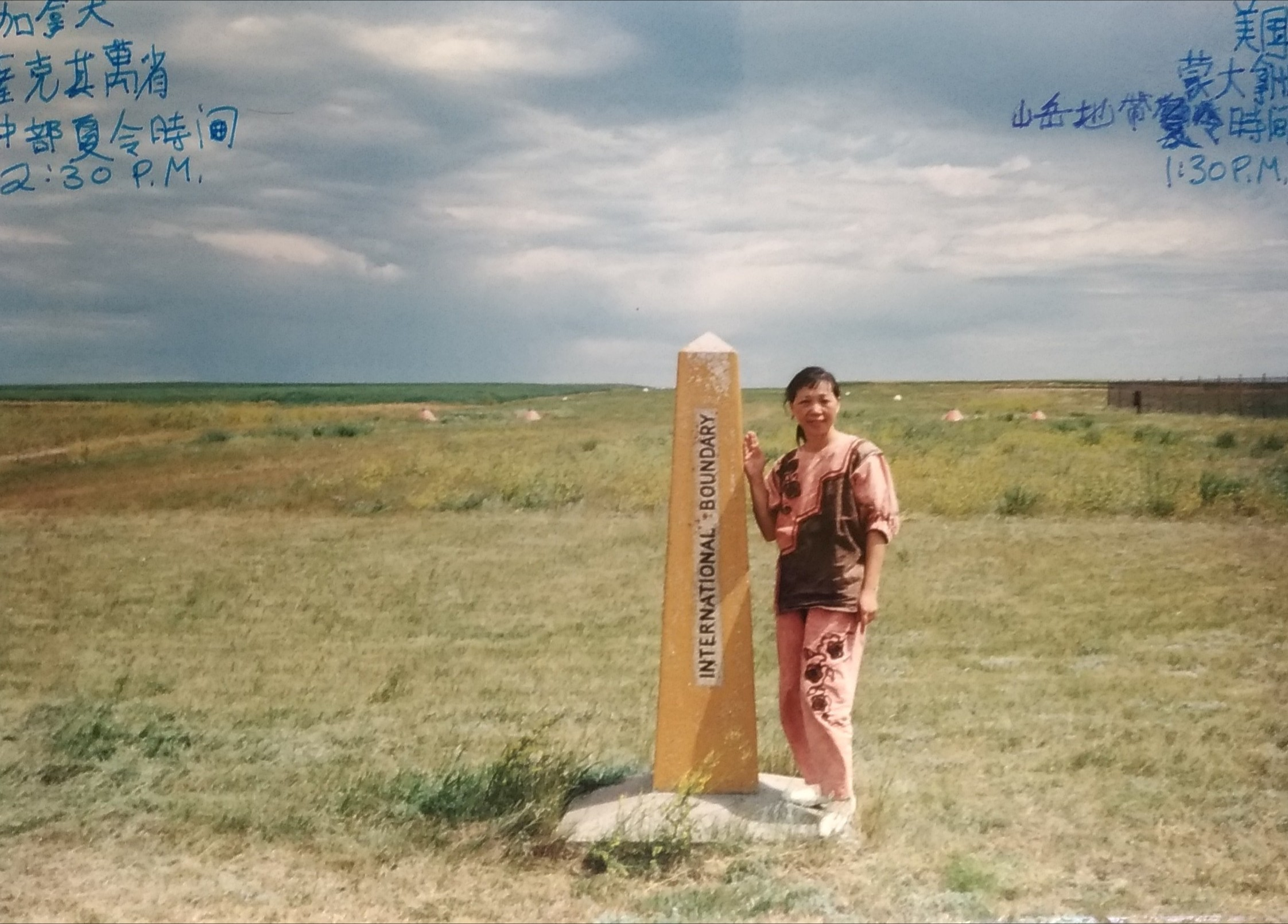
- International boundary marker at Montana-Saskatchewan border, with runway in background (1994)
- IATA: none; ICAO: none; FAA LID: 8U3; TC LID: CKK3

Summary
- Airport type: Public
- Owner: U.S. and Canadian Governments
- Operator: Montana Aeronautics Division
- Serves: Coronach, Saskatchewan; Scobey, Montana
- Location: RM of Hart Butte No. 11, Saskatchewan, Canada / Daniels County, Montana, USA
- Time zone: CST (CA)/MST (US) (UTC−06:00 (CA)/UTC−07:00 (US))
  - Summer (DST): MDT (UTC−06:00 (US))
- Elevation AMSL: 2,501 ft (762 m)
- Coordinates: 49°00′00″N 105°23′56″W; 49°00′00″N 105°24′02″W

Map
- Location in Saskatchewan/Montana CKK3/8U3 (Canada)

Runways
| Direction | Length | | Surface |
| Direction | ft | m | Surface |
|---|---|---|---|
| 08/26; 7/25 | 3,330 | 1,015 | Turf |

Statistics (2008)
- Aircraft operations: 10
- Sources: Canada Flight Supplement and Federal Aviation Administration

Coronach/Scobey Border Station Airport (FAA LID: 8U3, TC LID: CKK3) is located 8 nautical miles (15 km; 9.2 mi) southeast of Coronach, Saskatchewan, Canada and 13 mi (21 km) north of Scobey, Montana, United States. In the United States, the airport is known by the names Scobey Border Station Airport and East Poplar International Airport. It is owned by the U.S. and Canadian governments.

The runway lies exactly along the Canada–US border and is adjacent to the Scobey–Coronach Border Crossing between the two aforementioned towns. Customs may be cleared on either side of the border, but customs officials require two hours advance notice prior to landing, and landings are allowed only during the border crossing's normal hours of operation.

The airport is one of five airports that straddle the Canada–US border. The others are Avey Field State Airport, Whetstone International Airport, Coutts/Ross International Airport, and International Peace Garden Airport.

The airport is classified as an airport of entry by Nav Canada and is staffed by the Canada Border Services Agency (CBSA). CBSA officers at this airport currently handle general aviation aircraft only, with no more than fifteen passengers.

== Facilities and aircraft ==
The airport covers an area of 6 acres (2.4 ha) and has one runway with a 3,330 by 75 ft (1,015 by 23 m) turf surface. Canadian records list it as Runway 08/26 while U.S. records refer to it as Runway 7/25. For the 12-month period ending September 9, 2008, the airport had 10 general aviation aircraft operations.

== See also ==
- List of airports in Montana
- List of airports in Saskatchewan
