= Avey Field State Airport =

Avey Field State Airport Avey Field State/Laurier Airport
- IATA: none; ICAO: none; FAA LID: 69S

Summary
- Airport type: Public
- Owner/Operator: Elaine Slagle; Paul Wolfe
- Serves: Laurier, Washington
- Location: Canada–United States border
- Time zone: PST (UTC−08:00)
  - Summer (DST): PDT (UTC−07:00)
- Elevation AMSL: 1,655 ft (504 m)
- Coordinates: 48°59′54″N 118°13′22″W

Map
- Location in Washington 69S (the United States)

Runways
Direction	Length		Surface
Direction	ft	m	Surface
17/35; 16/34	1,975; 2,000	602; 610	Gravel

Statistics
- Aircraft operations: 800
- Sources: Federal Aviation Administration and Canada Flight Supplement

Avey Field State Airport (FAA LID: 69S) is a public use airport located on the Canada–US border at Laurier, in Ferry County, Washington, United States. It is privately owned and operated.

Also known as Avey Field State/Laurier Airport, it is one of five airports that straddle the Canada–US border. The others are Whetstone International Airport, Coutts/Ross International Airport, International Peace Garden Airport, and Coronach/Scobey Border Station Airport.

The airport is shared by the State of Washington and the Province of British Columbia. Both U.S. Customs and Border Protection and the Canada Border Services Agency have offices located nearby on U.S. Route 395 and British Columbia Highway 395 adjacent to the parking area.

The airport was managed by the Washington State Department of Transportation (Aviation Division) until August 2012, when management transferred to its private owners.

Laurier consists of the customs office and a post office. Little remains to indicate the thriving mining community of the 1890s. The nearest motels and recreational sites are located in Canada at a distance of 4 miles (6.4 km).

The Canadian recreational community of Christina Lake is 6.5 km (4.0 mi) north along Highway 395 and the Crowsnest Highway/Highway 3, while Orient, Washington, is approximately 10 mi (16 km) south along U.S. Route 395.

== History ==
The airport was constructed in 1962 as an emergency landing facility and was dedicated the following year by Senator Henry M. Jackson. Its sole runway extends 500 feet (150 m) into Canada.

== Facilities and aircraft ==
The unattended airport is at an elevation of 1,655 ft (504 m) above mean sea level and covers 10 acres (4.0 ha). The gravel runway 17–35 measures 1,975 by 40 feet (602 x 12 m). It is marked with retro-reflective devices, but both shoulders are soft and rough.

Mountains and hills surround the airport and there are trees on both approaches. An overflight to verify field conditions and to rule out obstructions (such as pedestrians, vehicles or animals) is recommended. The field is usually open from June 1 to October 1.

For the 12-month period ending December 31, 2006, the airport had 800 general aviation aircraft operations, an average of 66 per month.

== See also ==
- List of airports in Washington
