= Coutts/Ross International Airport =

Airport on the Canada–United States border

Coutts/Ross International Airport Ross International Airport
- IATA: none; ICAO: none; FAA LID: 7S8; TC LID: CEP4

Summary
- Airport type: Public
- Owner: State of Montana
- Operator: Montana Aeronautics Division
- Serves: Coutts, Alberta; Sweet Grass, Montana
- Location: Canada–United States border
- Time zone: MST (UTC−07:00)
  - Summer (DST): MDT (UTC−06:00)
- Elevation AMSL: 3,552 / 3,553 ft (1,083 / 1,083 m)
- Coordinates: 48°59′54″N 111°58′42″W; 48°59′55″N 111°58′52″W

Map
- Location in Montana / Alberta

Runways
Direction	Length		Surface
Direction	ft	m	Surface
07/25	2,900	884	Grass / Turf

Statistics (2007 / 2008)
- Aircraft operations: 25
- Source: Canada Flight Supplement and Federal Aviation Administration

Coutts/Ross International Airport (FAA LID: 7S8, TC LID: CEP4) is located 0.5 nautical miles (0.93 km; 0.58 mi) west of Coutts, Alberta, Canada, and 0.1 NM (0.19 km; 0.12 mi) west of Sweet Grass, Montana, United States.

Ross International Airport is owned by the U.S. state of Montana and is operated by the Montana Aeronautics Division. Its runway is located on the Canada–US border.

The airport is one of five airports that straddle the Canada–US border. The others are Avey Field State Airport, Whetstone International Airport, International Peace Garden Airport, and Coronach/Scobey Border Station Airport.

The airport is classified as an airport of entry by Nav Canada and is staffed by the Canada Border Services Agency (CBSA), whose officers at this airport can handle general aviation aircraft only, with no more than 15 passengers.

== Facilities and aircraft ==
The airport covers an area of 20 acres (8.1 ha) at an elevation of 3,552 ft (1,083 m) above mean sea level. It has one runway designated 7/25 with a turf surface measuring 2,900 by 80 ft (884 by 24 m). For the 12-month period ending August 23, 2008, the airport had 25 general aviation aircraft operations, an average of 2 per month.

== Use during World War II ==
Since the Neutrality Acts of the 1930s forbade arms shipments to belligerent countries prior to the American entry into World War II, this airport was used to circumvent these rules by landing planes on the US side and having civilians (and in some cases horses) pull them across the border to Canada, where they could be flown to the United Kingdom.

== See also ==
- List of airports in Montana
- List of Airports in Alberta
