= International Peace Garden Airport =

- IATA: none; ICAO: none; FAA LID: S28

Summary
- Airport type: Public
- Owner: North Dakota Aeronautics Commission
- Serves: Dunseith, North Dakota
- Location: Rolette County, North Dakota
- Elevation AMSL: 2,314 ft (705 m)
- Coordinates: 48°59′52″N 100°02′36″W

Map
- Location of airport in North Dakota S28 (the United States)

Runways
Direction	Length		Surface
Direction	ft	m	Surface
11/29	3,000	914	Asphalt

Statistics (2011)
- Aircraft operations: 630
- Sources: FAA and Canada Flight Supplement

International Peace Garden Airport (FAA LID: S28) is a public use airport in Rolette County, North Dakota, United States on the Canada–US border. The airport is owned by the North Dakota Aeronautics Commission and is located 11 nautical miles (20 km) north of the central business district of Dunseith, North Dakota. It is included in the National Plan of Integrated Airport Systems for 2011–2015, which categorized it as a general aviation facility.

The airport is located just east of the International Peace Garden on the North Dakota/Manitoba border. It is an airport of entry to Canada and the United States for general aviation aircraft with no more than 15 passengers and is served by adjacent US and Canadian customs stations.

The airport is one of five airports that straddle the Canada–US border. The others are Avey Field State Airport, Whetstone International Airport, Coutts/Ross International Airport, and Coronach/Scobey Border Station Airport.

== Facilities and aircraft ==
International Peace Garden Airport covers an area of 49 acres (20 ha) at an elevation of 2,314 feet (705 m) above mean sea level. It has one runway designated 11/29 with an asphalt surface measuring 3,000 by 60 feet (914 m × 18 m).

For the 12-month period ending September 4, 2011, the airport had 630 aircraft operations, an average of 52 per month: 71% general aviation, 16% air taxi, and 13% military.

== See also ==
- List of airports in North Dakota
