= Mobile Passport Control =

Mobile app by U.S. Customs and Border Protection

- Developer: U.S. Customs and Border Protection
- Stable release: 2.6.2 / April 2, 2024
- Operating system: Android, iOS
- Available in: English, French, German, Italian, Spanish
- Type: Customs declaration
- Website: www.cbp.gov/travel/us-citizens/mobile-passport-control

Mobile Passport Control (MPC) is a mobile app that enables eligible travelers entering the United States to submit their passport information and customs declaration form to Customs and Border Protection via smartphone or tablet and go through the inspections process using an expedited lane. It is available to "U.S. citizens, U.S. lawful permanent residents, Canadian B1/B2 citizen visitors and returning Visa Waiver Program travelers with approved ESTA".

The app is available on iOS and Android devices and is operational at 34 US airports, 14 international airports offering preclearance facilities, and 4 seaports. The use of Mobile Passport Control operations have increased threefold from 2016 to 2017.

== History ==
Mobile Passport Control operations were launched in Atlanta at the Hartsfield-Jackson International Airport in 2016 and is now available at 34 U.S. airports, 14 international airports that offer preclearance and 4 U.S. cruise ports. The Mobile Passport app is authorized by CBP and sponsored by the Airports Council International-North America, Boeing, and the Port of Everglades. Airside Mobile, Inc. secured a Series A funding of $6 million in the fall of 2017.

== How it works ==
During the customs process at the Federal Inspection Service (FIS) area of a U.S. airport, travelers arriving from international locations typically wait in long lines before presenting passports and paperwork and verbally answering questions made by CBP officials. Eligible travelers who have downloaded the Mobile Passport app can expedite this process by submitting information regarding their passport and trip details, and a newly-taken selfie, via their mobile device to CBP officials, then access an expedited line. Mobile Passport Control users will be required to show their physical passport(s) and briefly talk to a CBP officer.

== Locations ==
=== US airports ===
- Atlanta (ATL)
- Baltimore (BWI)
- Boston (BOS)
- Charlotte (CLT)
- Chicago (ORD)
- Dallas/Ft Worth (DFW)
- Denver (DEN)
- Detroit (DTW) as of 7/2024
- Ft. Lauderdale (FLL)
- Honolulu (HNL)
- Houston (HOU and IAH)
- Kansas City (MCI)
- Las Vegas (LAS)
- Los Angeles (LAX)
- Miami (MIA)
- Minneapolis (MSP)
- New York (JFK)
- Newark (EWR)
- Oakland (OAK)
- Orlando (MCO)
- Palm Beach (PBI)
- Philadelphia (PHL)
- Phoenix (PHX)
- Pittsburgh (PIT)
- Portland (PDX)
- Sacramento (SMF)
- San Diego (SAN)
- San Francisco (SFO)
- San Jose (SJC)
- San Juan (SJU)
- Seattle (SEA)
- Tampa (TPA)
- Washington Dulles (IAD)

=== International preclearance locations ===
- Abu Dhabi (AUH)
- Aruba (AUA)
- Bermuda (BDA)
- Calgary (YYC)
- Dublin (DUB)
- Edmonton (YEG)
- Halifax (YHZ)
- Montreal (YUL)
- Nassau (NAS)
- Ottawa (YOW)
- Shannon (SNN)
- Toronto (YYZ)
- Vancouver (YVR)
- Winnipeg (YWG)

=== Seaports ===
- Fort Lauderdale (PEV)
- Miami (MSE)
- San Juan (PUE)
- West Palm Beach (WPB)

== See also ==
- Global Entry
- SENTRI
- NEXUS
