= Collins–Valentine line =

Segment of the Canada–United States border

The Collins–Valentine line, or Valentine–Collins line, is the boundary at approximately 45 degrees north latitude that separates the province of Quebec from the states of New York and Vermont. It was surveyed and marked by survey monuments in 1771–1773 by John Collins, surveyor-general of Quebec, and Thomas Valentine, a commissioner appointed by the government of New York.

Quebec had been governed by France until the conclusion of the Seven Years' War in 1763, after which it was governed by Britain. In the 1760s, the region that would later become the state of Vermont was considered by authorities in Britain and New York to be a part of what was then called the Province of New York, although that status was a matter of some dispute among New York, New Hampshire, Massachusetts, and the inhabitants of the disputed territory. Thus, the boundary was intended to be between Quebec and New York. In the Gazetteer of the State of New York, we read that:

By royal proclamation, issued in Oct. 1763, the line 45° N. was fixed as the boundary between the provinces of Quebec and New York, and this was confirmed in council Aug. 12, 1768. The line was surveyed by Valentine and Collins, Oct. 20, 1774.

The Treaty of Paris of 1783, which established peace between Britain and the United States, said the boundary was to be the 45th parallel, and it was generally assumed that was equivalent to the line that had been marked by monuments in the 1770s. Joseph Bouchette, writing about the re-survey agreed upon in the Treaty of Ghent, states that:

In determining the geographical boundary between St. Regis and the Connecticut River, it was soon discovered that the original demarcation of the 45th parallel of north latitude widely deviated from the true course of that parallel, the position of which was carefully ascertained by the joint observations of the British and American astronomers employed on that service in 1818. It was found that the pre-existing line was drawn almost wholly north of the true geographical bearing of that circle of latitude ... at St. Regis the old line was actually 1,375 feet [419 m], statute measure, north of the 45° of north latitude, and that Ellicott's line [surveyed the previous year] was 30 feet [9.1 m] too far north ...

The Webster–Ashburton Treaty of 1842 said that the measurement errors stand, so the boundary is where Collins and Valentine erected the monuments.

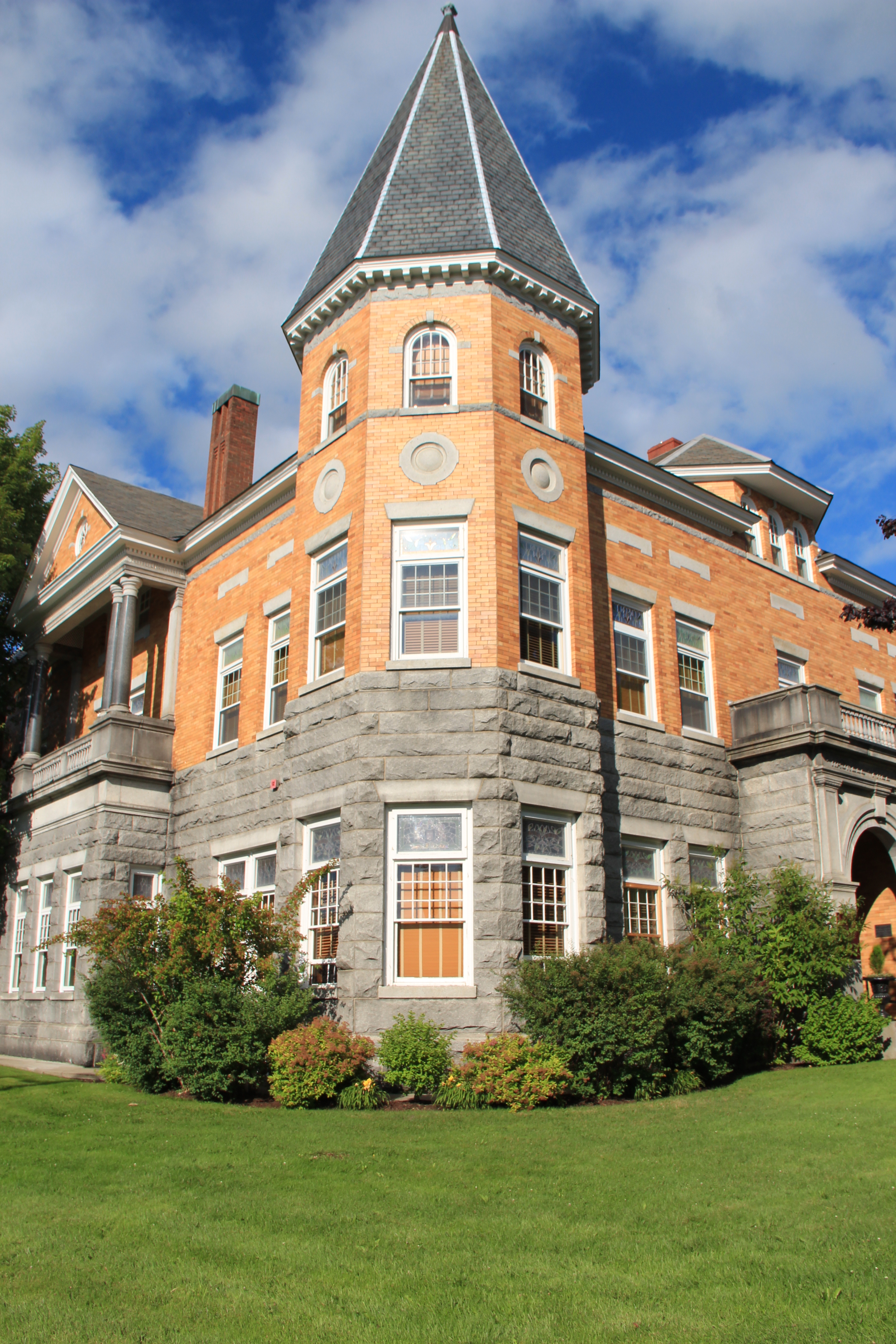
The Haskell Free Library and Opera House is the best-known among buildings that straddle the Canada–United States border.

The Collins–Valentine line passes directly through several buildings, sometimes called line houses. Most notable among these is the Haskell Free Library and Opera House in Rock Island (now part of Stanstead, Quebec, and Derby Line, Vermont, respectively). All of these were built before an international treaty forbade building within three meters (about ten feet) of the boundary without authorization from the International Boundary Commission. Today the commission maintains survey monuments along the Collins–Valentine line, as along the rest of the Canada–United States border, and keeps the line clear of brush and vegetation.

== See also ==
- Mason–Dixon line, surveyed in the 1760s, separating Pennsylvania from three states to its south
