= Contiguous United States =

48 states of the US apart from Alaska and Hawaii

A map showing the contiguous United States

The contiguous United States, also known as the U.S. mainland, officially referred to as the conterminous United States, consists of the 48 adjoining U.S. states and the District of Columbia of the United States in central North America. The term excludes the only two non-contiguous states and the last two to be admitted to the Union, which are Alaska and Hawaii, and all other offshore insular areas, such as the U.S. territories of American Samoa, Guam, the Northern Mariana Islands, Puerto Rico, and the U.S. Virgin Islands. The colloquial term Lower 48 is also used, especially in relation to Alaska. The term The Mainland is used in Hawaii. The related but distinct term continental United States includes Alaska, which is also in North America, but separated from the 48 states by British Columbia in Canada, but excludes Hawaii and all the insular areas in the Caribbean and the Pacific.

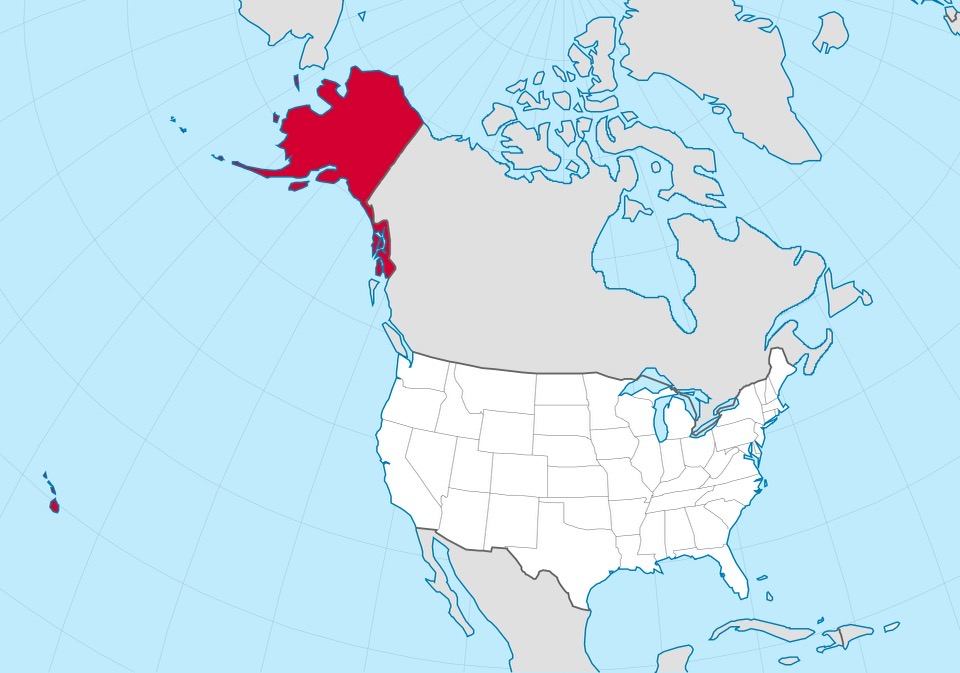
Map highlighting Alaska and Hawaii's geographical relationship to the contiguous United States. Alaska, in red, is in the upper part of the map, while Hawaii is the islands also in red to the far left. Contiguous US is near the center in white

The greatest distance on a great-circle route entirely within the contiguous U.S. is 2,802 miles (4,509 km), coast-to-coast between Florida and Washington state; the greatest north–south line is 1,650 miles (2,660 km). The contiguous United States occupies an area of 3,119,884.69 square miles (8,080,464.3 km^{2}). Of this area, 2,959,064.44 square miles (7,663,941.7 km^{2}) is actual land, composing 83.65 percent of the country's total land area, and is comparable in size to the area of Australia. Officially, 160,820.25 square miles (416,522.5 km^{2}) of the contiguous United States is water area, composing 62.66 percent of the nation's total water area.

If just the contiguous United States were a country, it would be fifth on the list of countries and dependencies by area, behind Russia (Europe and Asia), Canada (North America), China (Asia), and Brazil (South America). However, the total area of the United States, including Alaska and Hawaii, ranks third or fourth. Brazil is 166,000 square miles (431,000 km^{2}) larger than the contiguous United States, but smaller than the entire United States, including Alaska, Hawaii, and overseas territories. The 2020 U.S. census population of the area was 328,571,074, comprising 99.13 percent of the nation's total population, and a density of 111.04 inhabitants/sq mi (42.872/km^{2}), compared to 93.844/sq mi (36.233/km^{2}) for the nation as a whole.

== Other terms ==
While conterminous U.S. has the precise meaning of contiguous U.S. (both adjectives meaning "sharing a common boundary"), other terms commonly used to describe the 48 contiguous states have a greater degree of ambiguity.

=== Continental and mainland United States ===
Because Alaska is also a part of North America, the term continental United States also includes that state, so the term is qualified with the explicit inclusion of Alaska to resolve any ambiguity. On May 14, 1959, the United States Board on Geographic Names issued the following definitions based partially on the reference in the Alaska Omnibus Bill, which defined the continental United States as "the 49 States on the North American Continent and the District of Columbia..." The Board reaffirmed these definitions on May 13, 1999. However, even before Alaska became a state, it was properly included within the continental U.S. due to being an incorporated territory.

The term mainland United States is sometimes used synonymously with continental United States, but technically refers only to those parts of states connected to the landmass of North America, thereby excluding not only Hawaii and overseas insular areas, but also islands which are part of continental states but separated from the mainland, such as the Aleutian Islands (Alaska), San Juan Islands (Washington), the Channel Islands (California), the Keys (Florida), the barrier islands (Gulf and East Coast states), and Long Island (New York).

=== CONUS and OCONUS ===
CONUS, a technical term used by the U.S. Department of Defense, General Services Administration, NOAA/National Weather Service, and others, has been defined both as the continental United States and as the 48 contiguous states. The District of Columbia is not always specifically mentioned as being part of CONUS.

OCONUS is derived from CONUS with O for outside added, thus referring to Outside of Continental United States.

=== The lower 48 ===
The term lower 48 is also used to refer to the conterminous United States. The National Geographic style guide recommends the use of contiguous or conterminous United States instead of lower 48 when the 48 states are meant, unless used in the context of Alaska. Almost all of Hawaii is south of the southernmost point of the conterminous United States in Florida.

=== Zone of the Interior ===
During World War II, the first four numbered Air Forces of the United States Army Air Forces (USAAF) were said to be assigned to the Zone of the Interior by the American military organizations of the time—the future states of Alaska and Hawaii, then each only organized incorporated territories of the Union, were respectively covered by the Eleventh Air Force and Seventh Air Force during the war.

== Terms used in the non-contiguous U.S. jurisdictions ==
Residents of Alaska, Hawaii, and offshore U.S. territories have unique labels for the contiguous United States because of their own locations relative to it.

=== Alaska ===
The vast territory of Alaska became the 49th state of the United States on January 3, 1959. Alaska is the northwest extremity of the North American continent, separated from the U.S. West Coast by the Canadian province of British Columbia. The term Lower 48 has, for many years, been a common Alaskan equivalent for "contiguous United States"; some people in Alaska may use the term Outside for those states, though some may use Outside to refer to any location not within Alaska.

=== Hawaii ===
The territory of Hawaii, consisting of the entire Hawaiian Islands archipelago except for Midway Atoll, (Note: Midway is an unorganized and unincorporated territory of the United States.) became the 50th state of the United States on August 21, 1959. It is the southernmost U.S. state, and the latest one to join the Union. Not part of any continent, Hawaii is located in the Pacific Ocean, about 2,200 miles (3,541 km) from North America and almost halfway between North America and Asia. In Hawaii and overseas American territories, for instance, the terms the Mainland or U.S. Mainland are often used to refer to the 49 states in North America.

=== Puerto Rico ===
Puerto Rico is a Spanish-speaking unincorporated territory of the United States located in the northeast Caribbean Sea, approximately 1,000 miles (1,609 km) southeast of Miami, Florida. Puerto Ricans born in Puerto Rico are U.S. citizens and are free to move to the mainland United States. The term Stateside Puerto Rican refers to residents of any U.S. state or the District of Columbia who were born in, or can trace their family ancestry to Puerto Rico.

=== U.S. Virgin Islands ===
The U.S. Virgin Islands is a U.S. territory located directly to the east of Puerto Rico in the Caribbean Sea. The term stateside is used to refer to the mainland, in relation to the U.S. Virgin Islands (see Stateside Virgin Islands Americans).

=== American Samoa ===
American Samoa is a U.S. territory located in the South Pacific Ocean in Polynesia, south of the equator—it is 2,200 miles (3,500 km) southwest of Hawaii. In American Samoa, the contiguous United States is called the "mainland United States" or "the states"; those not from American Samoa are called palagi (outsiders).

== Non-contiguous areas within the contiguous United States ==
Apart from offshore U.S. islands, a few continental portions of the contiguous United States are accessible by road only by traveling through Canada. Point Roberts, Washington; Elm Point, Minnesota, and two nearby points; the Northwest Angle in Minnesota; a peninsula in Osthus Lake in North Dakota's Rolette County and a slice of land on the edge of Lake Metigoshe in Bottineau County bordering Winchester, Canada, are seven such places. Alburgh, Vermont is not directly connected by land to the rest of the contiguous US, but is accessible by road via bridges from within Vermont and from New York, and nearby Province Point is accessible over land only from Canada, though no roads go there. In contrast, Hyder, Alaska, is physically part of contiguous Alaska and is its easternmost town, but the only practical overland access is by road through Canada.

== List of contiguous U.S. states by region ==
The 48 contiguous states (divided in map's parts) are:

- Alabama (Southern)
- Arizona (Western)
- Arkansas (Southern)
- California (Western)
- Colorado (Western)
- Connecticut (Northeastern)
- Delaware (Southern)
- Florida (Southern)
- Georgia (Southern)
- Idaho (Western)
- Illinois (Midwestern)
- Indiana (Midwestern)
- Iowa (Midwestern)
- Kansas (Midwestern)
- Kentucky (Southern)
- Louisiana (Southern)
- Maine (Northeastern)
- Maryland (Southern)
- Massachusetts (Northeastern)
- Michigan (Midwestern)
- Minnesota (Midwestern)
- Mississippi (Southern)
- Missouri (Midwestern)
- Montana (Western)
- Nebraska (Midwestern)
- Nevada (Western)
- New Hampshire (Northeastern)
- New Jersey (Northeastern)
- New Mexico (Western)
- New York (Northeastern)
- North Carolina (Southern)
- North Dakota (Midwestern)
- Ohio (Midwestern)
- Oklahoma (Southern)
- Oregon (Western)
- Pennsylvania (Northeastern)
- Rhode Island (Northeastern)
- South Carolina (Southern)
- South Dakota (Midwestern)
- Tennessee (Southern)
- Texas (Southern)
- Utah (Western)
- Vermont (Northeastern)
- Virginia (Southern)
- Washington (Western)
- West Virginia (Southern)
- Wisconsin (Midwestern)
- Wyoming (Western)

In addition, the District of Columbia is within the contiguous United States.

== See also ==
- Extreme points of the United States
- Mainland
- Metropolitan France, nicknamed "l'Hexagone", is an analogous concept in France
