= Manitoba Provincial Road 308 =

Provincial road in Manitoba, Canada

Provincial Road 308
- PR 308 highlighted in red

Route information
- Maintained by Department of Infrastructure
- Length: 101.5 km (63.1 mi)
- Existed: 1966–present

Major junctions
- North end: PTH 1 (TCH) near East Braintree
- PR 525 in Northwest Angle Provincial Forest
- South end: PTH 12 near Sprague

Location
- Country: Canada
- Province: Manitoba
- Rural municipalities: Piney; Reynolds

Highway system
- Provincial highways in Manitoba; Winnipeg City Routes
← PR 307	→ PR 309

Provincial Road 308 (PR 308), is a provincial road in Manitoba, Canada. It runs from the Trans-Canada Highway near East Braintree to Highway 12 at Sprague near the United States border, travelling through the largely unpopulated boreal forests in the far southeastern region of the province. It also provides access to both Moose Lake Provincial Park and Birch Point Provincial Park. The road is unpaved from the Trans-Canada Highway to Moose Lake, the remainder of the road to Sprague is paved.

PR 308 provides access to the Northwest Angle, an exclave of the U.S. state of Minnesota, via PR 525.

== Related route ==
Provincial Road 525
- Location: Northwest Angle Provincial Forest
- Length: 10.2 km (6.3 mi)
- Existed: 1978–present

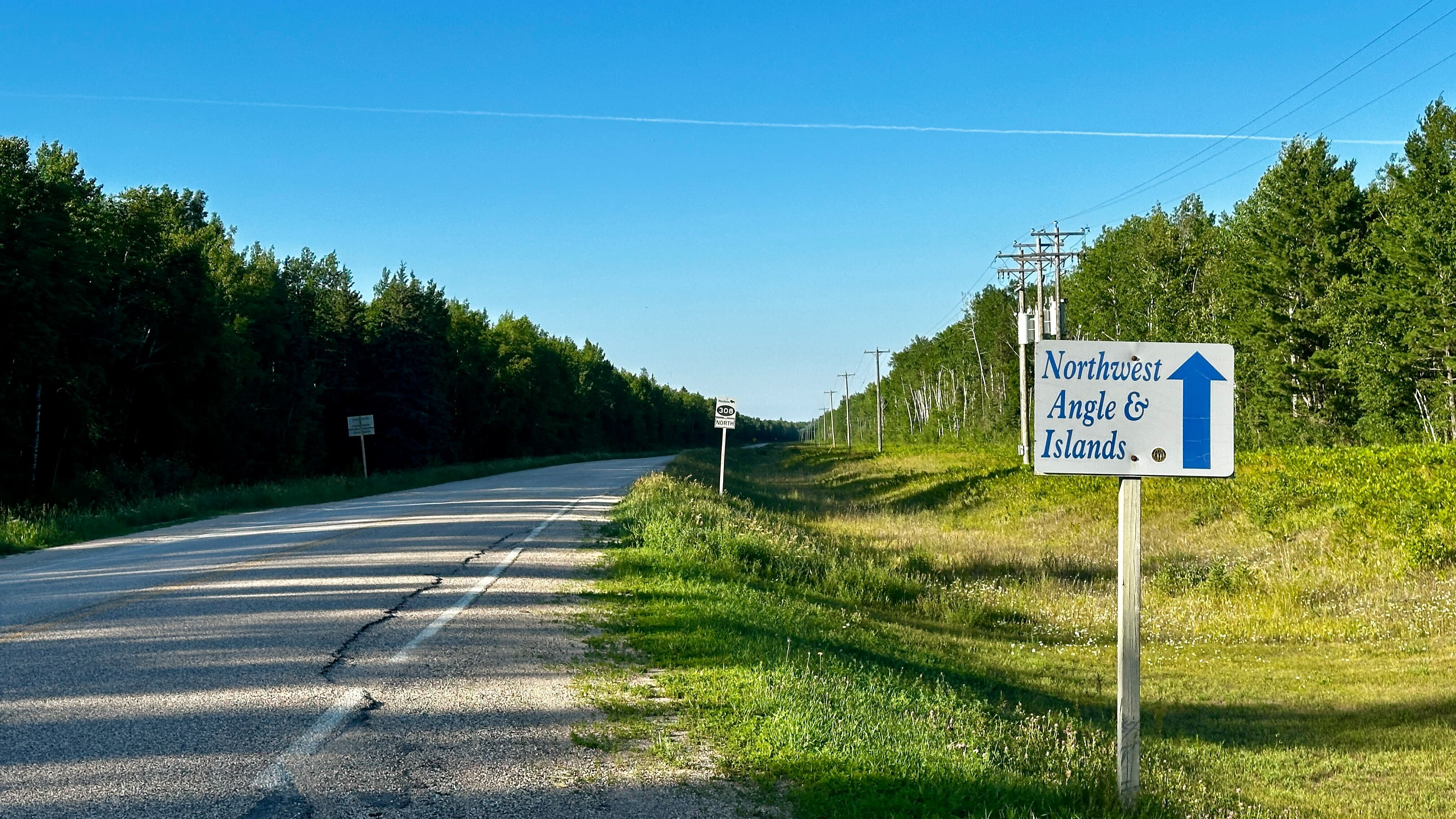
Looking north on PR 308 at Moose Lake.

Provincial Road 525 (PR 525) is a 10.2-kilometre-long (6.3 mi) east-west spur of PR 308 in the Northwest Angle Provincial Forest, providing the only road access in-and-out of the Northwest Angle, an exclave of Minnesota. It is entirely a two-lane gravel road, with no settlements or other major intersections along the route.

== Major intersections ==
Division	Location	km	mi	Destinations	Notes
Piney	Sprague	0.0	0.0	PTH 12 (MOM's Way) – Steinbach, Warroad	
No. 1	Northwest Angle Provincial Forest	35.3	21.9	Moose Lake Provincial Park, Birch Point Provincial Park	Access road into parks; former PR 509 east
No. 1	Northwest Angle Provincial Forest	43.5	27.0	PR 525 east – Northwest Angle	
Reynolds		92.3	57.4	PR 503 west (Dawson Road)	
Reynolds	East Braintree	100.8– 101.5	62.6– 63.1	PTH 1 (TCH) – Winnipeg, Falcon Lake	700 m (2,300 ft) gap in median
1.000 mi = 1.609 km; 1.000 km = 0.621 mi
