= CANUSA =

Canusa may refer to:

- CANUSA Games
- Canusa Street

== See also ==
- United States and Canada
