= Penasse, Minnesota =

- Unincorporated community
- Location within Minnesota Location within the United States
- Coordinates: 49°22′04″N 94°57′32″W
- Country: United States
- State: Minnesota
- County: Lake of the Woods
- Township: Angle
- Elevation: 1,073 ft (327 m)
- Time zone: UTC-6 (Central (CST))
  - Summer (DST): UTC-5 (CDT)
- Area code: 218
- GNIS feature ID: 649255

Penasse is an unincorporated community in Angle Township, Lake of the Woods County, Minnesota, United States. Penasse is located on Penasse Island in Lake of the Woods, in the northern part of Northwest Angle. Its location makes it the northernmost populated place in the contiguous United States. The community was named for Tom Penasse, an American Indian from the area; it had a post office from 1920 to 1969. The explorer La Vérendrye built Fort Saint Charles nearby in 1732.
