= Manitoba Provincial Road 525 =

Provincial road in Manitoba, Canada

Provincial Road 525

Route information
- Maintained by Manitoba Infrastructure
- Length: 10.2 km (6.3 mi)
- Existed: 1978–present

Major junctions
- West end: PR 308 in Northwest Angle Provincial Forest
- East end: CSAH 49 at the U.S. border near Angle Inlet

Location
- Country: Canada
- Province: Manitoba

Highway system
- Provincial highways in Manitoba; Winnipeg City Routes
← PR 524	→ PR 528

Provincial Road 525 (PR 525) is a short provincial road in southeastern Manitoba, Canada. It is a remote gravel road that runs from PR 308 east to the Canada–United States border at Northwest Angle, a practical exclave of Minnesota.

PR 525 provides the only land access to Northwest Angle from either country. The border crossing is unmanned; travellers must report to the Canadian or American authorities via a remote video connection from Northwest Angle prior to departure or upon arrival.

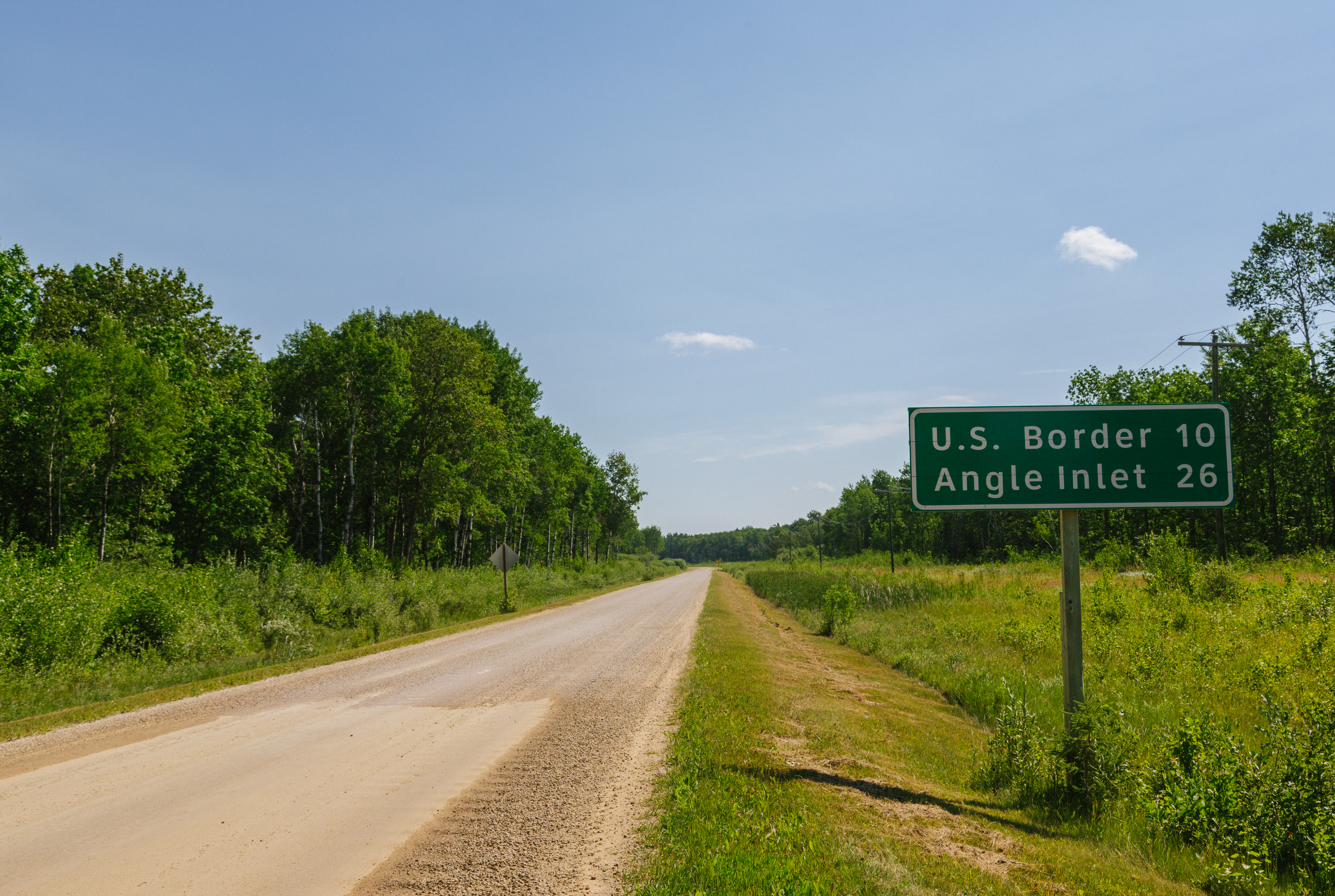
Distance sign on PR 525 just east of the intersection with PR 308

== History ==
What is now PR 525 originated as an unnumbered road as far back as 1971. It gained its current designation in 1978, and has changed very little since.

== Major intersections ==
Division	Location	km	mi	Destinations	Notes
No. 1	Northwest Angle Provincial Forest	0.0	0.0	PR 308 – Sprague, East Braintree	Western terminus
No. 1	Northwest Angle Provincial Forest	10.2	6.3	CSAH 49 east (Winter Road) – Angle Inlet	United States border; continuation into Minnesota; eastern terminus
1.000 mi = 1.609 km; 1.000 km = 0.621 mi

== See also ==
- List of Canada–United States border crossings
