= Oak Island (Minnesota) =

Island in Lake of the Woods County, Minnesota, United States

Coordinates: 49°18′36″N 94°50′53″W

Oak Island is an island in Lake of the Woods, Minnesota, United States. It lies near the center of the lake at the extreme northeastern corner of Minnesota's Northwest Angle, in Lake of the Woods County. The island is approximately 3 miles (4.8 km) long and 1 mile (1.6 km) wide. It contains several resorts, fishing camps, a small store, and a post office, established in 1920. Much of the island's interior is part of the Red Lake Indian Reservation.

== History ==
A post office was established in 1920.

== Geography ==
Oak Island is an island near the center of Lake of the Woods at the extreme northeast corner of Minnesota's Northwest Angle that reaches further north than the rest of the state. Oak Island is approximately three miles long and one mile wide. The island is the site of several resorts, fishing camps, a small store, and a post office. Much of the interior of the island is part of the Red Lake Indian Reservation. Off the southwest tip of Oak Island is an 18-acre island which is the summer headquarters of Laketrails Base Camp.
