= United States and Canada =

United States and Canada may refer to:

- Anglo-America, however that term is sometimes used to include all the English-speaking countries of the Americas.
- Northern America, which may also include some Atlantic island countries and territories
- Canada–United States international border vista
- Canada–United States relations
- Canada–United States border
