= Elm Point, Minnesota =

Uninhabited cape and exclave of the United States

Coordinates: 48°59′45″N 095°17′24″W

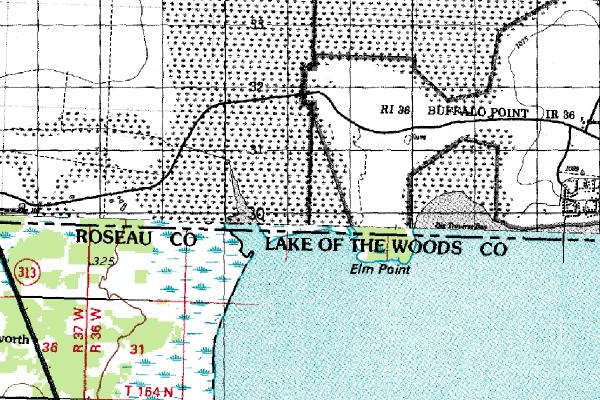
Detail of a USGS map of the area, erroneously showing Elm Point as part of Lake of the Woods County

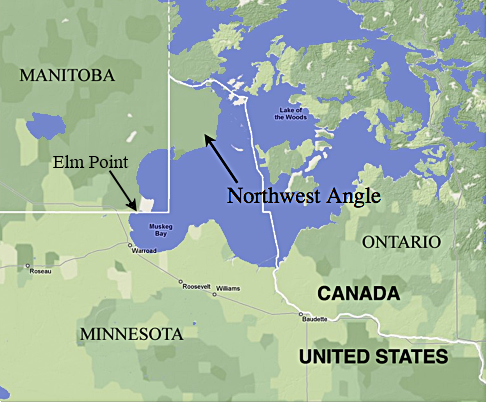
Map showing Elm Point in relation to the Northwest Angle

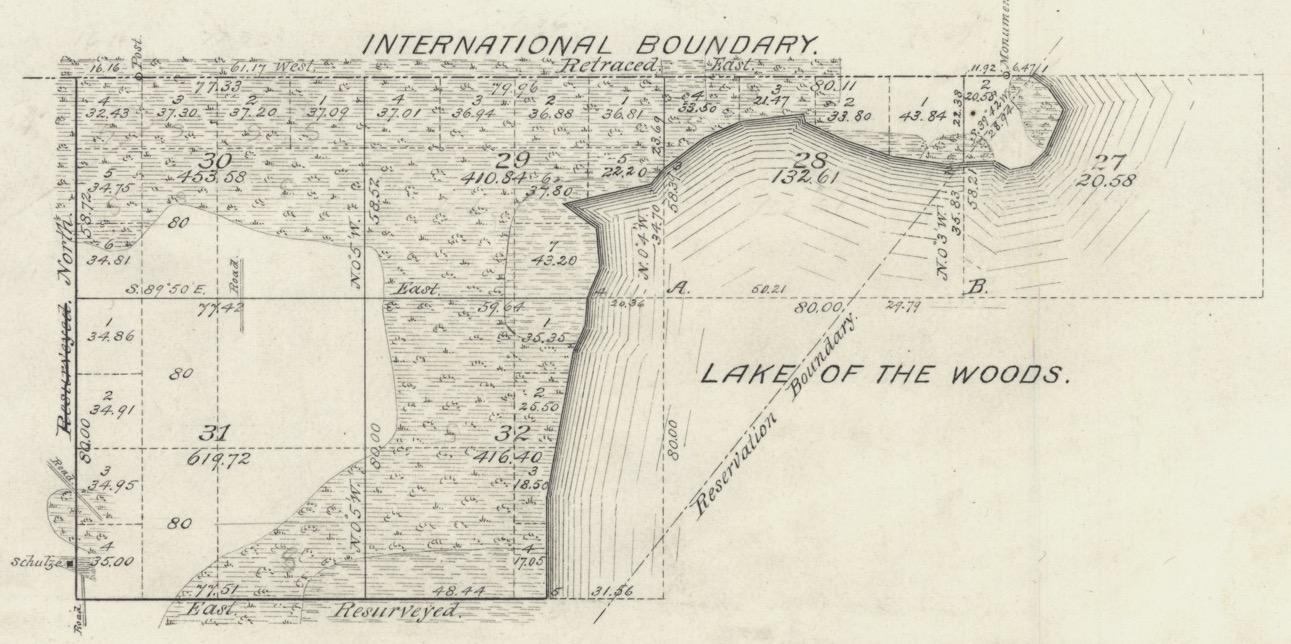
Close-up of the original United States government survey of Township 164 North, Range 36 West, showing Elm Point. This township was annexed to Roseau County by proclamation of Governor Clough dated February 10, 1896.

Proclamation of Minnesota Governor David Clough annexing territory to Roseau County, as published in the Roseau County Times on February 21, 1896.

Elm Point, Minnesota, is a small uninhabited cape and a practical exclave of the United States in Lake Township, Roseau County, Minnesota, United States. It is surrounded on the west, south, and east by Lake of the Woods, and on the north by the Canadian First Nation community of Buffalo Point in southeastern Manitoba. Part of Elm Point is privately owned and part of it is state land managed by the Department of Natural Resources as part of the Border Wildlife Management Area. It is located southwest of the much larger exclave known as the Northwest Angle. There is a line of felled trees marking the international border, which runs nominally along the 49th parallel, although in this area it runs slightly to the south due to 19th-century surveying errors.

In addition to Elm Point, there are a few small parcels of land located west of Elm Point but east of the contiguous land mass of Minnesota that extend up to 300 feet (100 m) south of the border, making them U.S. territory. One such area is Buffalo Bay Point.

== Jurisdictional confusion ==
There is some confusion as to whether Elm Point lies within Lake of the Woods County or Roseau County. The United States Census Bureau's block maps place it in Lake of the Woods County, as do many maps published by the Minnesota Department of Transportation. However, property taxes in the area are assessed by Roseau County, while the Lake of the Woods County GIS does not show any parcel data for the area. A 1916 state plat book shows it as part of Roseau County.

The confusion appears to result from the wording of Governor David Marston Clough's proclamation dated February 10, 1896, which annexed the area to Roseau County. The boundary of the area to be annexed ran easterly along the Canadian border "to the Lake of the Woods; thence easterly, following the south meandered shore of said Lake of the Woods." From the point where the Canadian border intersects Lake of the Woods, the shoreline first runs west around Elm Point and then south before turning east, making the wording of the proclamation infelicitous. The proclamation, however, states that the territory annexed includes the area of Township 164 North, Range 36 West, and that its boundaries "followed and conformed to the United States Survey lines of townships," as was required by law at the time. Elm Point is within T164N R36W (see image at right).

== See also ==
- Northwest Angle
- Point Roberts, Washington
- Alburgh, Vermont
- Province Island
- Hyder, Alaska
