= Manitoba Provincial Road 503 =

Provincial road in Manitoba, Canada

Provincial Road 503
- Old Dawson Trail

Route information
- Maintained by Department of Infrastructure
- Length: 34.6 km (21.5 mi)
- Existed: 1966–present

Major junctions
- West end: PTH 1 (TCH) near Hadashville
- PR 505 in Sandilands Provincial Forest
- East end: PR 308 near East Braintree

Location
- Country: Canada
- Province: Manitoba
- Rural municipalities: Reynolds

Highway system
- Provincial highways in Manitoba; Winnipeg City Routes
← PR 502	→ PR 504

Provincial Road 503 (PR 503) is a 34.6-kilometre-long (21.5 mi) east–west highway in the Eastman Region of Manitoba. Travelling through both the Sandilands and Northwest Angle Provincial Forests, it serves as the designation for a portion of the historic Old Dawson Trail (a.k.a. Dawson Road).

== Route description ==
PR 503 begins just across the Whitemouth River from Hadashville at an intersection with the Trans-Canada Highway (PTH 1), heading southwest along the banks of the river for a few kilometres to enter the Sandilands Provincial Forest, coming to an intersection with its spur PR 505, where the highway turns east along the Old Dawson Trail. The highway winds its way through remote woodlands for several kilometres, temporarily entering the Northwest Angle Provincial Forest and crossing the Birch River before coming to an end at a junction with PR 308 just south of East Braintree. The entire length of PR 503 is a two-lane gravel road, lying with the Rural Municipality of Reynolds in its entirety.

== Major intersections ==
Division	Location	km	mi	Destinations	Notes
Reynolds		0.0	0.0	PR 308 – East Braintree, Sprague	Eastern terminus
Reynolds	Northwest Angle Provincial Forest	4.3	2.7	Bridge over the Birch River	
Reynolds	Northwest Angle Provincial Forest	4.9	3.0	East Braintree Road – East Braintree	
Reynolds	Sandilands Provincial Forest	25.7	16.0	PR 505 west (Old Dawson Trail west)	Eastern terminus of PR 505; Old Dawson Trail continues along PR 505 west
Reynolds		34.6	21.5	PTH 1 (TCH) – Winnipeg, Kenora	Western terminus; road continues north as Spur Road 69E
1.000 mi = 1.609 km; 1.000 km = 0.621 mi

== Related route ==
Provincial Road 505
- Old Dawson Trail
- Location: Sandilands Provincial Forest
- Length: 5.2 km (3.2 mi)
- Existed: 1966–present

Provincial Road 505 (PR 505) is a 5.2-kilometre-long (3.2 mi) east–west spur of PR 503 in the Sandilands Provincial Forest. Comprising a segment of the historic Old Dawson Trail, it runs from PR 503 to a dead end along the banks of the Whitemouth River. It is entirely a two-lane gravel road.

On the other side of the river, Dawson Road begins again and travels through the Eastman ATV Park towards Richer.

Division	Location	km	mi	Destinations	Notes
Reynolds	Sandilands Provincial Forest	0.0	0.0	Dead end at the Whitemouth River	Western terminus
Reynolds	Sandilands Provincial Forest	5.2	3.2	PR 503 (Old Dawson Trail east) – Hadashville, East Braintree	Eastern terminus; Old Dawson Trail follows PR 503 east
1.000 mi = 1.609 km; 1.000 km = 0.621 mi
