= Line house =

Building deliberately built across a geopolitical boundary

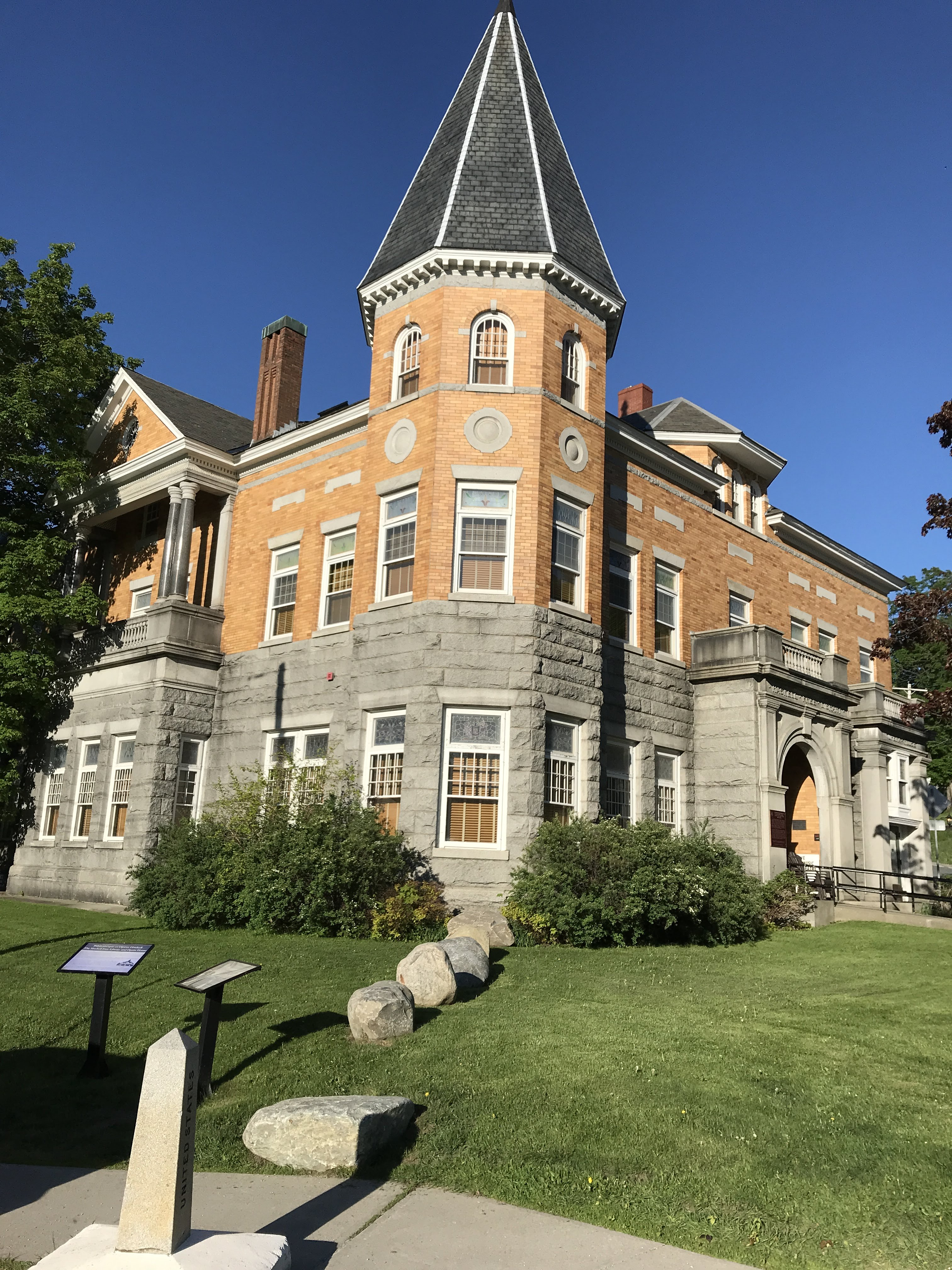
The Haskell Free Library and Opera House is the best-known among buildings that straddle the Canada–United States border. The border is marked with boulders. In this picture, Canada is on the left side and the United States is on the right.

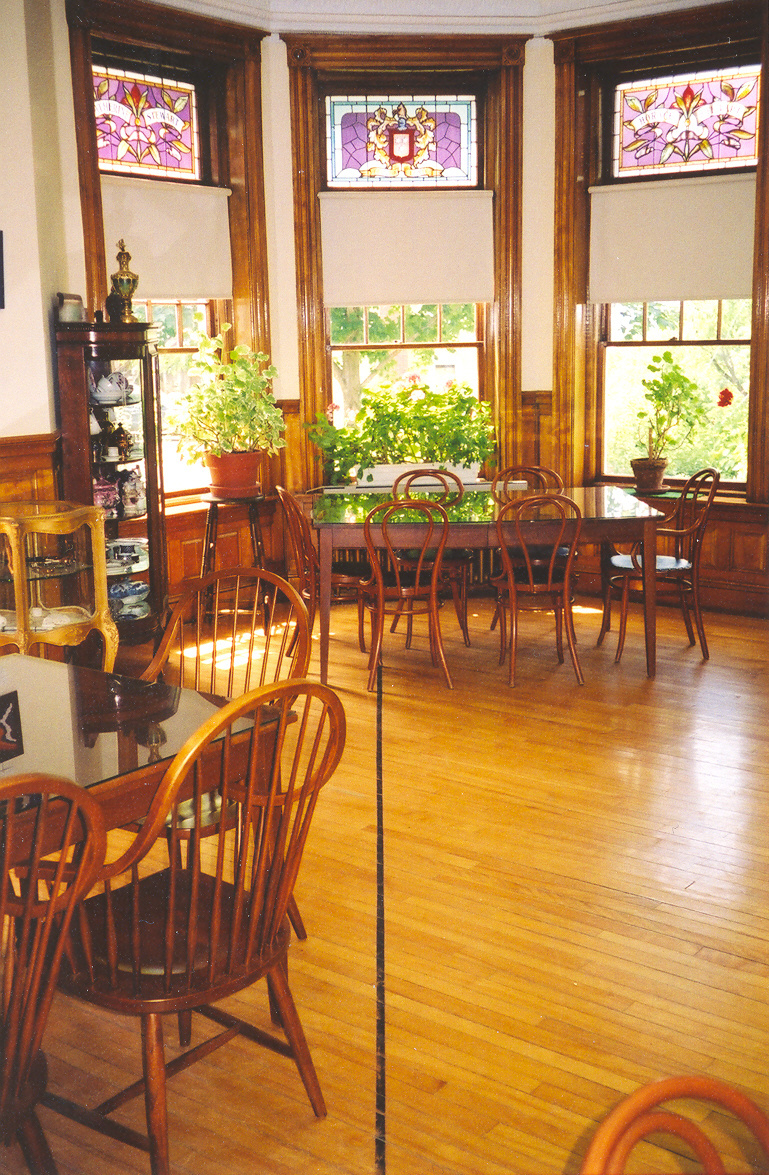
The international boundary is marked as a black line on the floor of the reading room of the Haskell Library. In this picture, Canada is on the right side of the line and the United States is on the left.

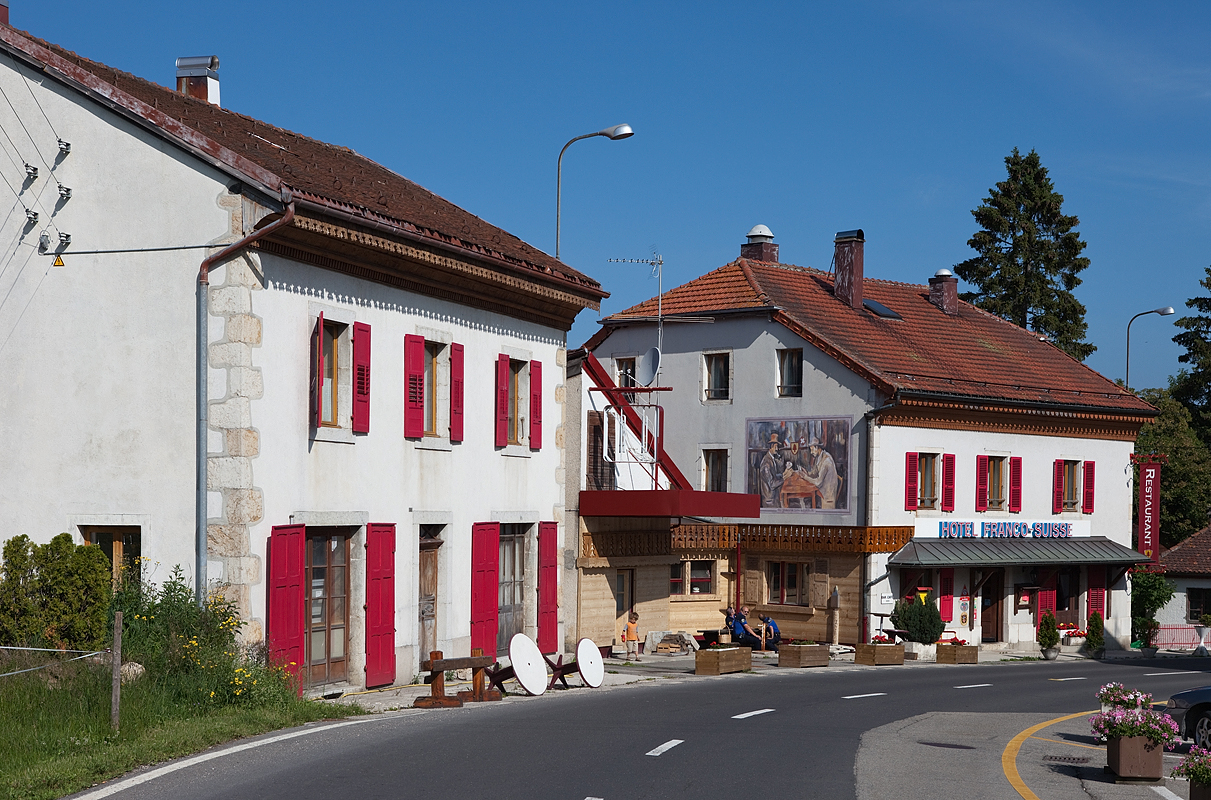
Hotel Arbez in La Cure. The border runs lengthwise through the two buildings, passing just to the left of the mural. The mural and everything to the right of it lies in Switzerland, and France lies to the left.

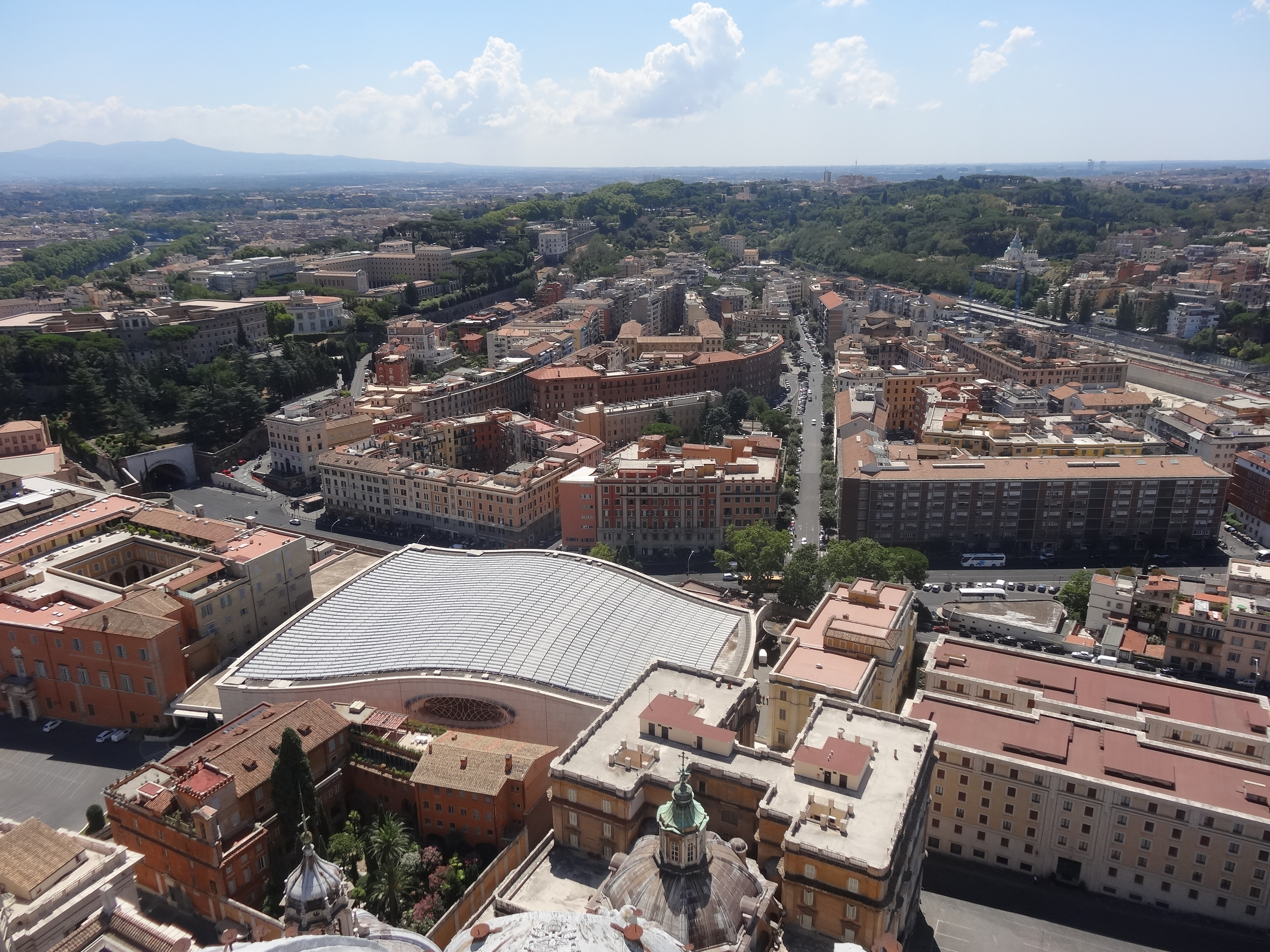
The Paul VI Audience Hall on the border between the Vatican City and Italy. The border runs crosswise through the building, with the Vatican City on the right side and Italy on the left side of the building.

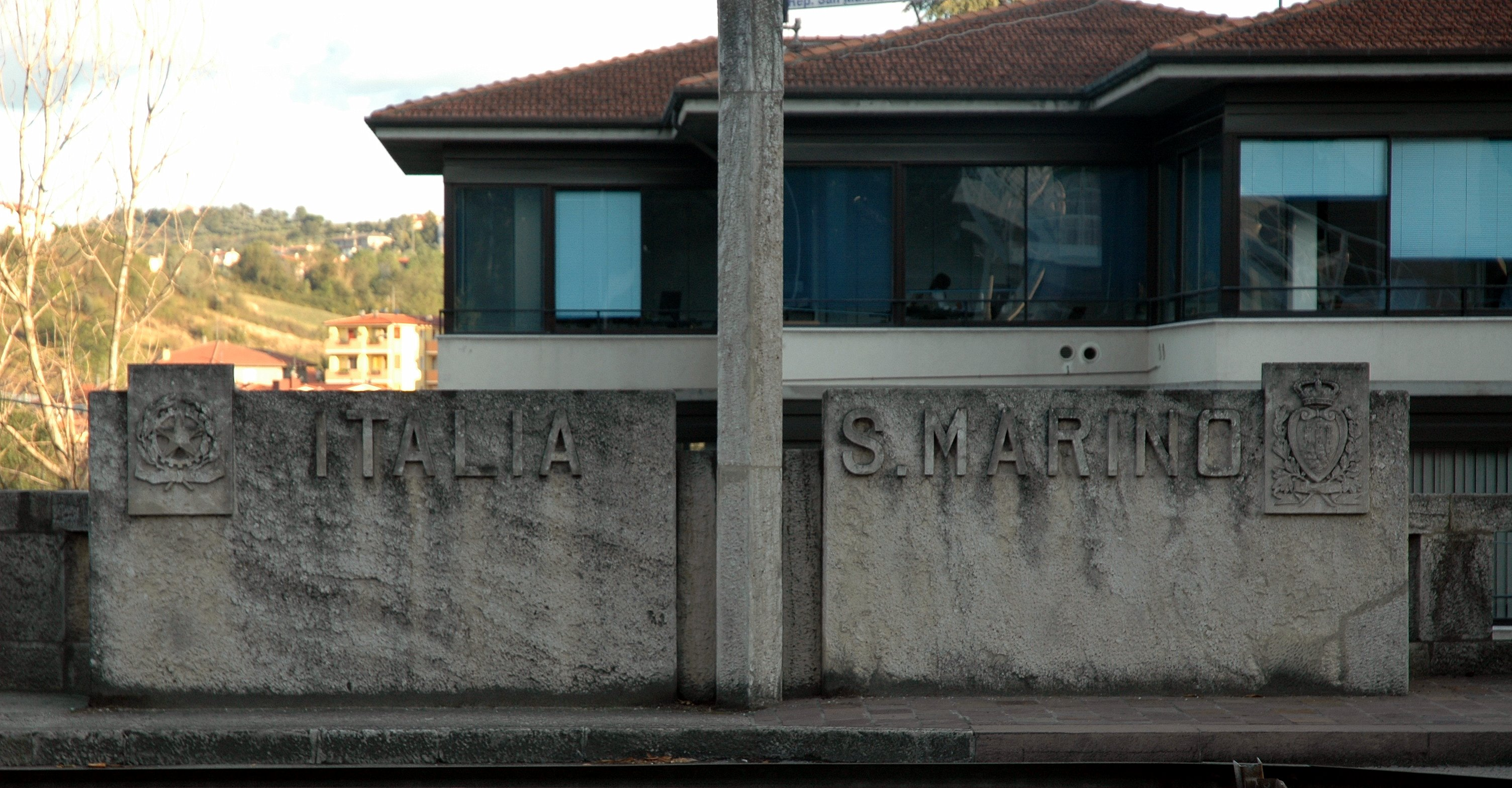
Line house on the border between Italy and San Marino in Dogana.

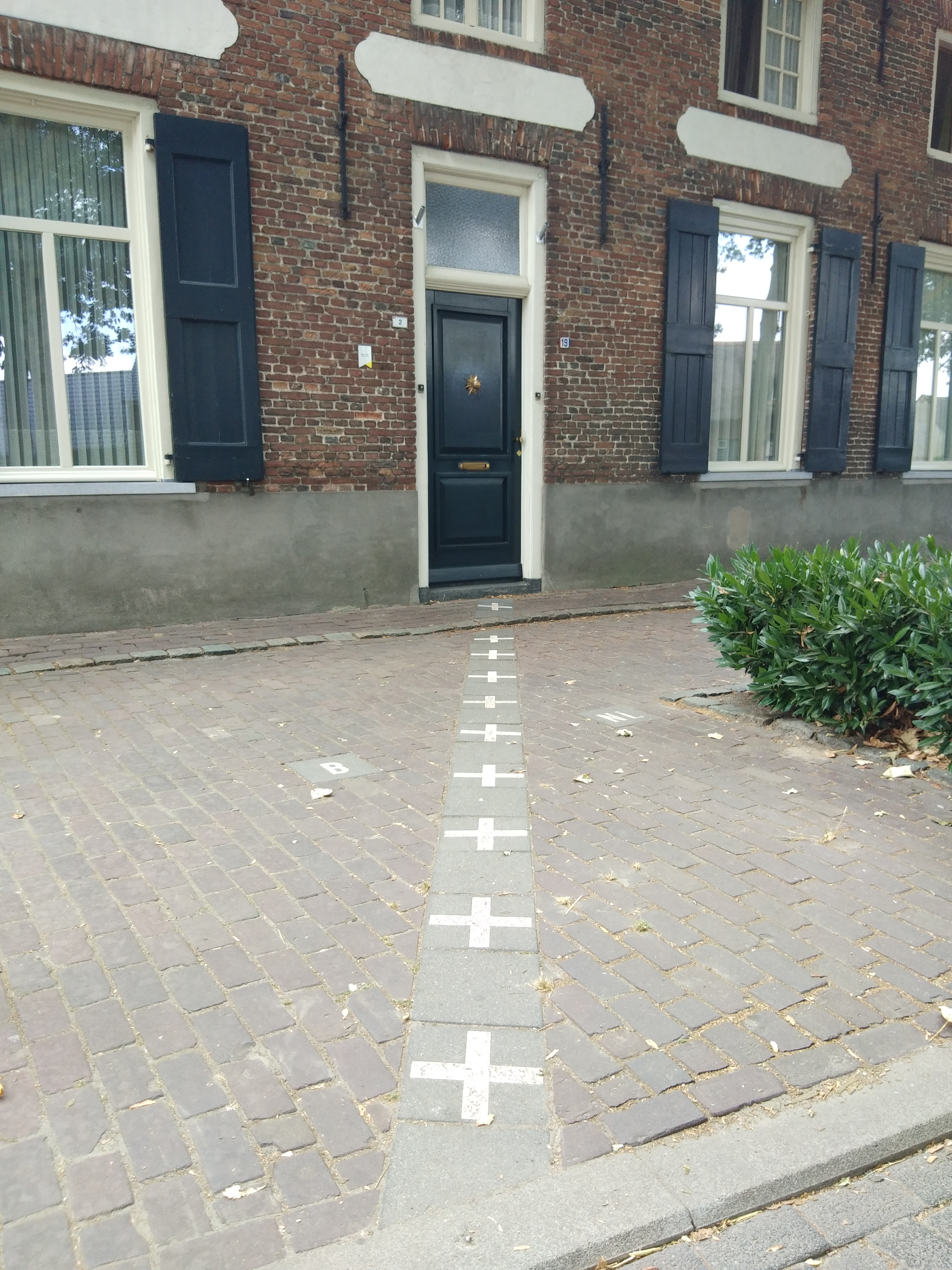
House on the border of Belgium and the Netherlands in the towns of Baarle-Hertog and Baarle-Nassau respectively. Belgium is on the left marked with letter "B" on the pavement and the Netherlands is on the right marked with letter "NL" on the pavement.

A line house is a building deliberately located so that an international boundary passes through it.

One such building on the boundary between the United States and Canada is the Haskell Free Library and Opera House in Stanstead, Quebec, and Derby Line, Vermont. The border is marked on the floor in a reading room and an auditorium. A number of single-family residences and some industrial buildings straddle the boundary in those two towns. The International Boundary Commission encourages line houses to be abandoned as part of its mandate to clearly demarcate the Canada–United States border. The Haskell Free Library and most other line houses are on the Collins–Valentine line between Quebec and New York/Vermont.

Line houses exist also in Baarle-Hertog and Baarle-Nassau on the border between Belgium and the Netherlands.

The border between the United Kingdom and the Republic of Ireland passes through many houses and other buildings.

In Sungai Haji Kuning at Sebatik Island, which is divided between Malaysia and Indonesia, there is a house divided by the countries' borders.

Paul VI Audience Hall, located partially in the Vatican City, but mostly in Rome, Italy: the Italian part of the building is treated as an extraterritorial area of the Holy See and is used by the Pope as an alternative to Saint Peter's Square when conducting his Wednesday morning General Audience.

== See also ==
- Joint Security Area
- Demilitarized zone
