= International Boundary Commission =

Organization that maps Canada–US border

- Commission de la frontière internationale
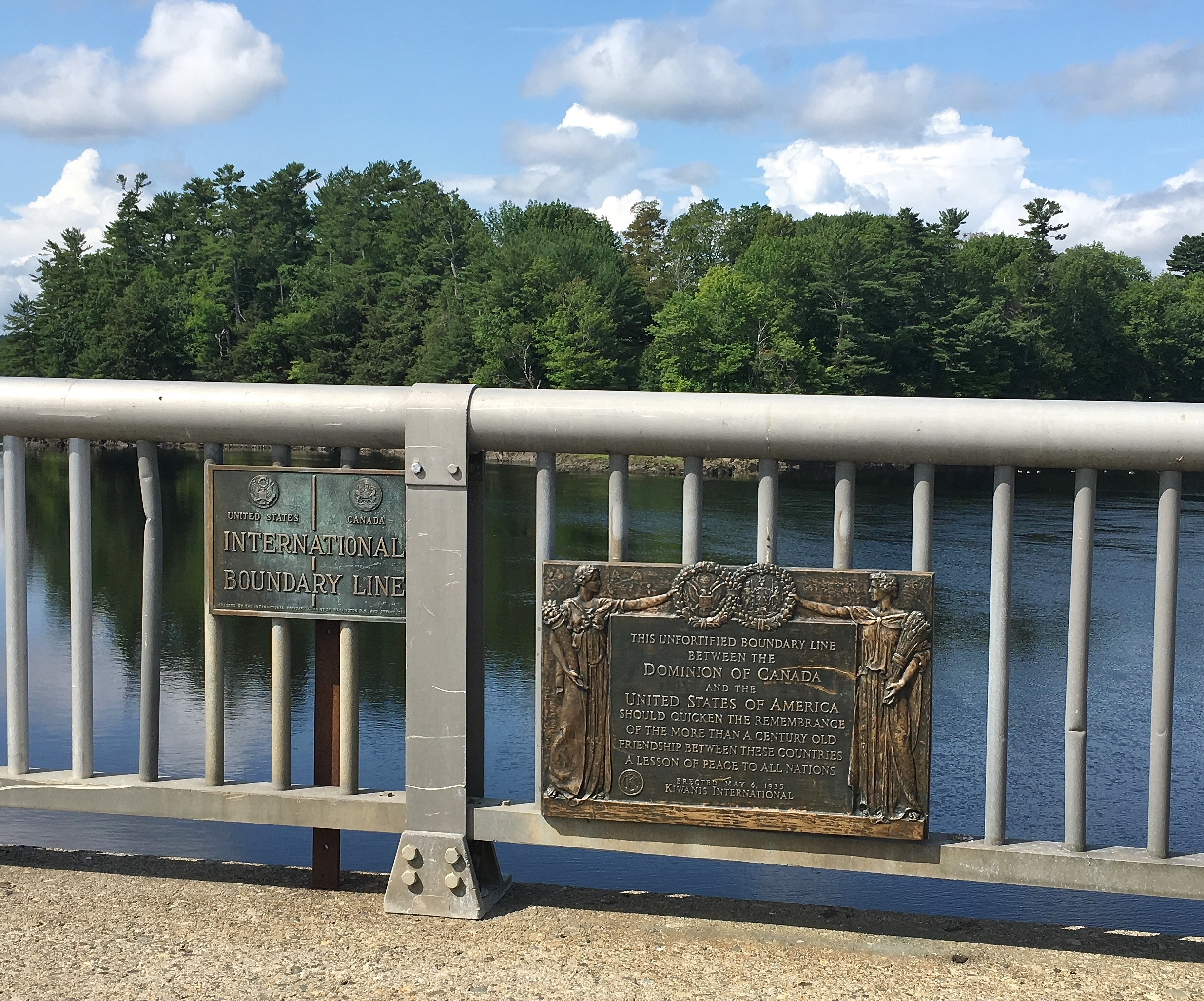
- Sign at the international border between Calais, Maine, in the United States and St. Stephen, New Brunswick, in Canada (August 2019)
- Abbreviation: IBC
- Formation: 1908
- Purpose: Surveying and mapping the Canada–United States border
- Commissioners: (Canada) Martin Gingras (United States) J. T. Moore
- Website: internationalboundarycommission.org

The International Boundary Commission (French: Commission de la frontière internationale) is a bi-national organization responsible for surveying and mapping the Canada–United States border and regulating construction close to the border. The commission was created in 1908 and made permanent by a treaty in 1925.

Its responsibilities also include maintaining boundary monuments and buoys, keeping the border vista on each side clear of brush and vegetation within three meters (about 10 feet) from the boundary, overseeing any applications for permission to build within the vista, and reporting annually to the governments of both countries.

== Structure ==
The International Boundary Commission is led by two commissioners, one from the United States and one from Canada, each with their own budget and staff. The American commissioner is appointed by the president of the United States and reports to the secretary of state. The Canadian commissioner is appointed by the governor-in-council and also serves as the surveyor general of Canada under the minister of natural resources.

The current commissioners are J. T. Moore (acting commissioner, United States) and Martin Gingras (Canada).

David L. Bernhardt, the former United States secretary of the interior, was the IBC commissioner from the United States from 2007 to 2008.

=== 2007 dismissal controversy ===
In July 2007, the Bush administration relieved American Commissioner Dennis Schornack of his post in connection with a dispute between the boundary commission and the American government over private construction near the border. Schornack rejected the dismissal, saying that the commission is an independent, international organization outside the American government's jurisdiction, and that according to the 1908 treaty that created it, a vacancy can only be created by "the death, resignation or other disability" of a commissioner. The Government of Canada said that it was taking no position on the matter, but Peter Sullivan, the Canadian commissioner, said on July 13 that he was ready to work with David Bernhardt, who had been designated as the acting American commissioner by President Bush. In October 2007, American federal judge Marsha J. Pechman ruled that the president can fire the boundary commissioner.

== Provisions ==
=== Erecting of structures or buildings ===
The treaty establishing the commission provides that every power line, pipeline, railroad, highway, or other structure crossing the boundary or built within 3 meters (about 9 feet 10 inches) of the boundary must await authorization from the commission before construction work can be done. Various "line houses"—buildings through which the international boundary crosses—were built on the boundaries between the state of Maine and the province of New Brunswick, the state of Vermont and the province of Quebec, and the state of New York and the province of Quebec before any requirement for the commission's permission existed. Some of these still stand. The most well known is the Haskell Free Library and Opera House, intentionally located astride the boundary. The International Peace Garden, built in 1932 on the boundary between Manitoba and North Dakota, required authorization from the commission.

== See also ==
- Borders of Canada
- Borders of the United States
- Boundary Commission Trail
