= Birch Point Provincial Park =

Provincial park in Manitoba, Canada

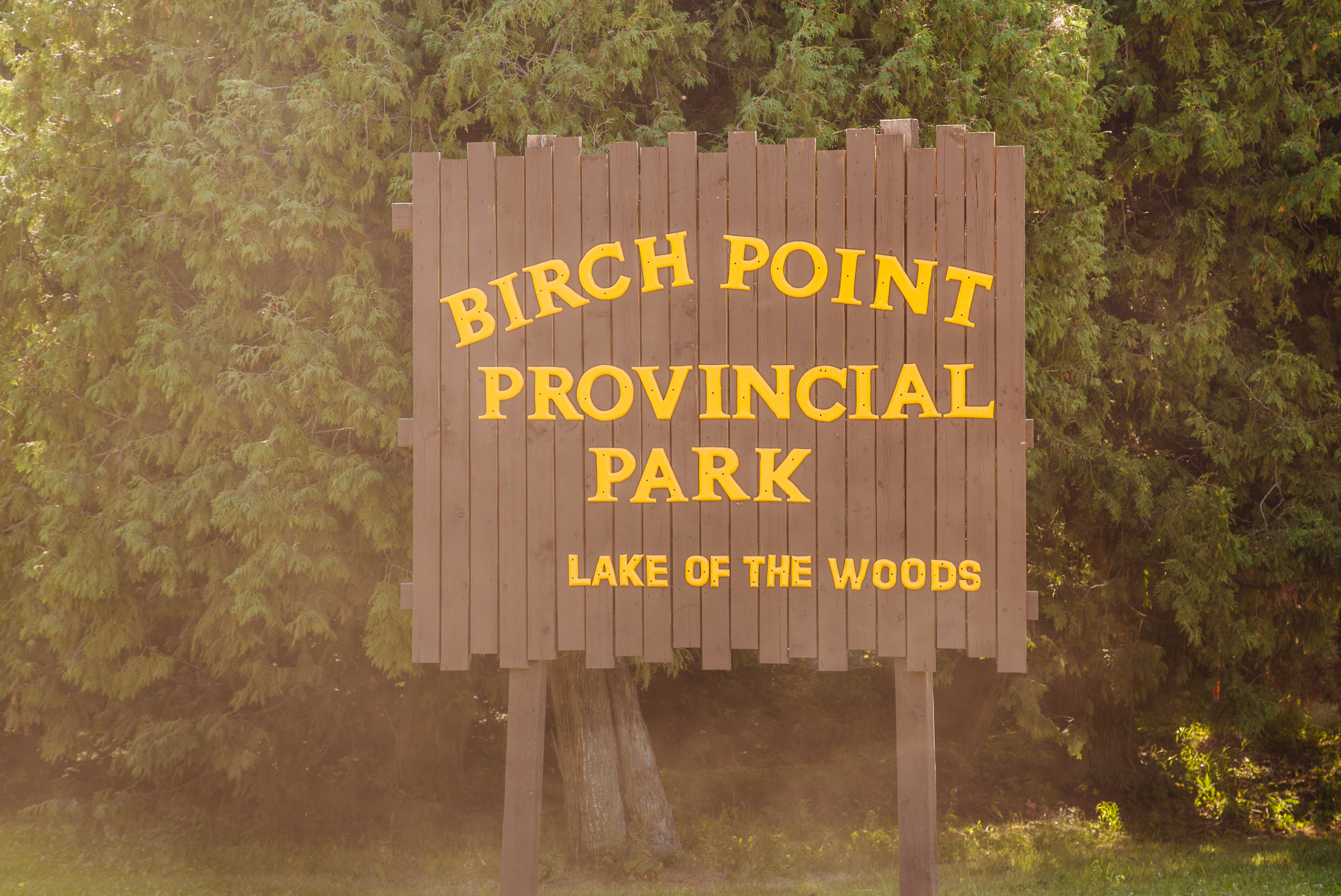

- Location within Manitoba
- Interactive map of Birch Point Provincial Park
- Location: Manitoba, Canada
- Nearest town: Winnipeg, Manitoba
- Coordinates: 49°10′7″N 95°13′57″W
- Area: 13.1 ha (32 acres)
- Established: 1961
- Governing body: Government of Manitoba

Birch Point Provincial Park is a provincial park located on Buffalo Bay, Lake of the Woods in Manitoba, Canada., about 160 kilometres (99 mi) southeast of Winnipeg. It is 13.1 hectares (0.051 sq mi) in size. It was designated as a Provincial Park in 1961.

== Natural environment ==
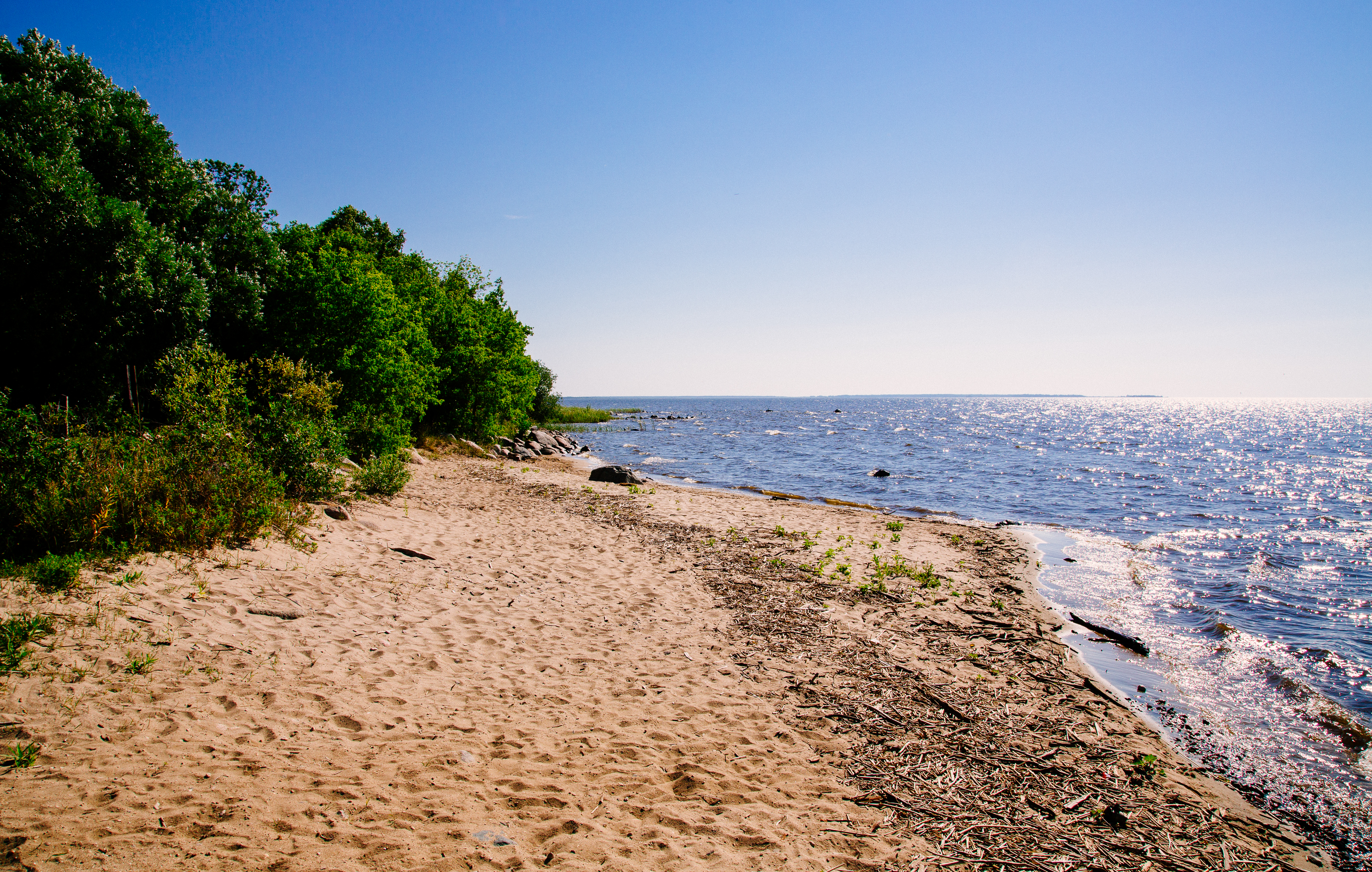

The park is located in the Whitemouth eco-district within the Lake of the Woods ecoregion. This eco-region is part of the Boreal Shield Ecozone.

The most recent glaciation and post-glacial Lake Agassiz deposited layers of glacial till across the area. Outcrops of bedrock are common.

Black spruce and tamarack are found in poorly drained places, particularly those with peat soil. Mixed forests in the drier areas include jack pine, trembling aspen, paper birch, white spruce, eastern white cedar, black ash, white elm, red pine and eastern white pine.

== See also ==
- List of protected areas of Manitoba
