= Canada–United States international border vista =

Man-made track of deforestation on international border

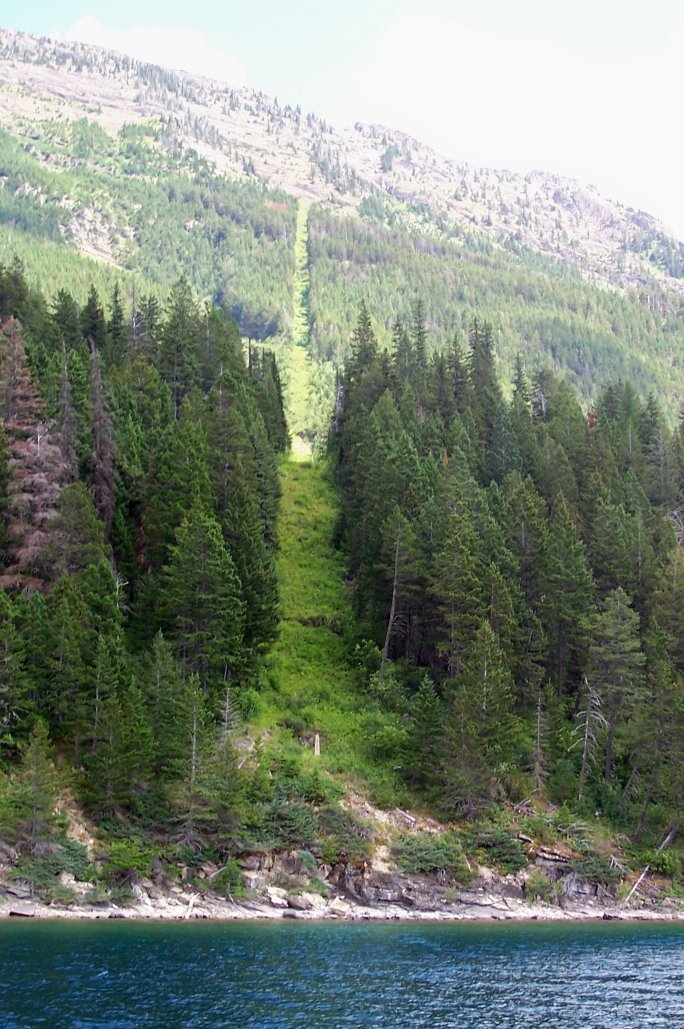
"The Slash" visible from Waterton Lake demarcating the border between Alberta (left) and Montana (right).

The Canada–United States international border vista (colloquially known as The Slash) is a man-made track of deforestation that demarcates portions of the border between the two nations.

== Description ==
This border vista is a 20-foot-wide (6.1 m) man-made cut-through of forestland maintained along areas of the border with dense forestation. There are many different sections of the vista, and the total length can vary depending on cycles of maintenance and upkeep, but an approximate length of 1,349 miles (2,171 km) has been reported by the United States Department of Homeland Security (DHS).

From a bird's eye perspective, the vista appears as a "line" running through the wilderness, and can be clearly seen on satellite imagery.

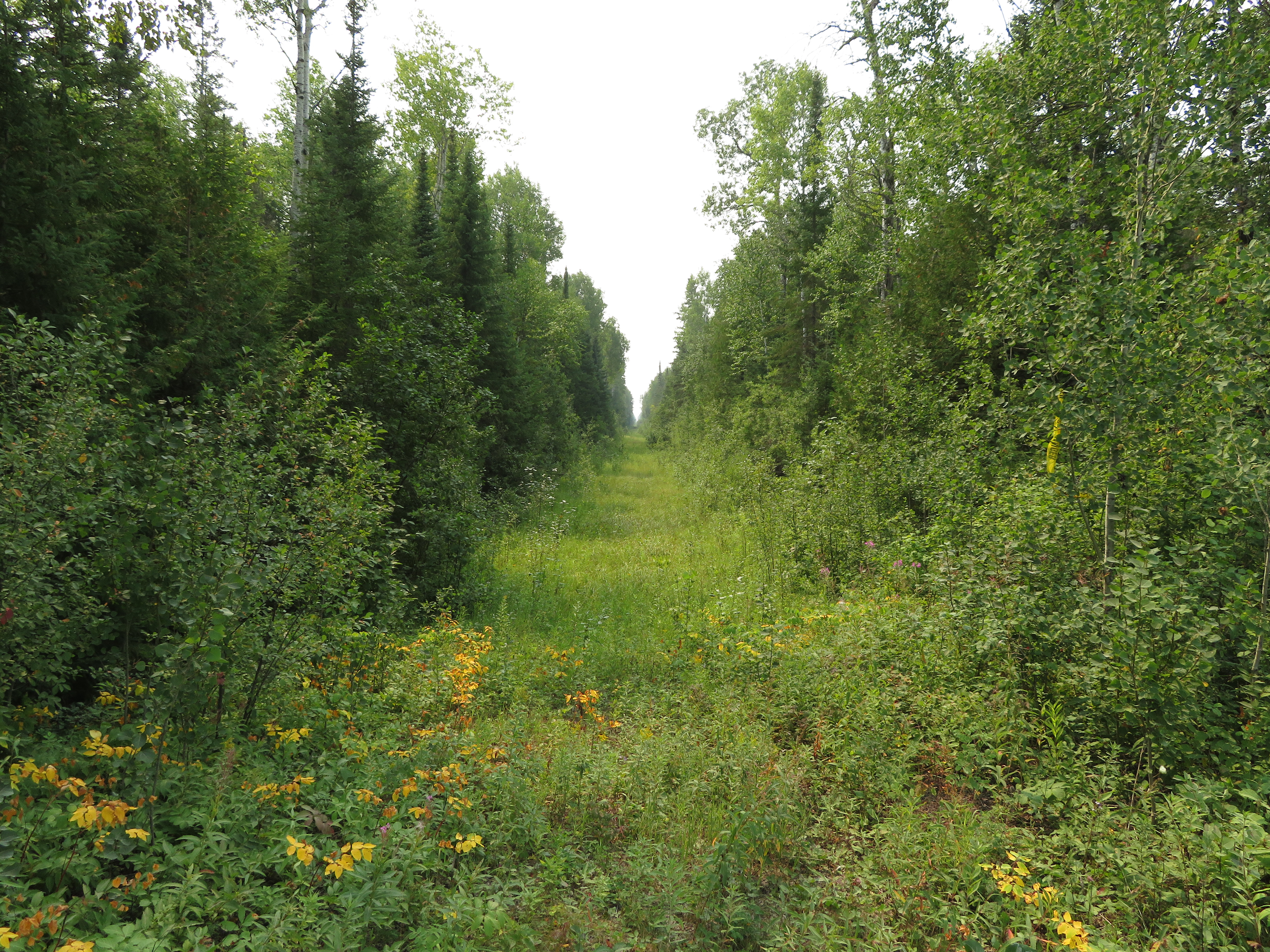
A section of the border between Minnesota and Manitoba, on the Northwest Angle

From the ground, one would observe that the vista follows a series of man-made survey monuments that mark the border along the northern 49th parallel, the Alaska/Canada border, and the non-linear eastern border. Because of inaccurate measurements by the official surveyors in the 19th century, the border and thus the vista strays from the intended location by hundreds of feet in some places. It is the actual location of the monuments, however, and not their intended location that defines the border by treaty. It is illegal to cross the vista without official permission.

== History ==
The vista was the result of a larger border maintenance plan officially agreed upon by the two nations in treaties signed in 1908 and 1925 (the vista had existed, unofficially, since the 1800s). The International Boundary Commission (IBC) was created by the treaties, with members from both nations, and mandated to clearly demarcate the international border. In more populous, less forested areas, this was accomplished largely with signs, monuments, physical barriers, and service roads; but the mountainous terrain and wilderness conditions in certain areas made that approach impractical, thus the 20-foot-wide track of deforestation was adopted as a solution.

== Maintenance ==
Each country is responsible for funding the maintenance of 10 feet (3.0 m) on either side of the center-line. The IBC reports a $1.4 million annual budget (total amount for all border maintenance, including vista clearing). The American half of this equates to about one half cent per taxpayer each year. Every six years the vista undergoes an extensive cut-back of any encroaching wilderness.

== Enforcement ==
The U.S. Customs and Border Protection agency (CBP) is tasked with monitoring all border activity. This can be challenging in the remote areas of the vista, so DHS and the CBP's divisions of border patrol cooperated to install third-party technology in the form of solar-powered, motion-detecting surveillance equipment, known as the Slash CameraPole system. The equipment is generally placed along areas of the vista that are within hiking distances of major highways.
