= John Collins (merchant) =

John Collins (died April 15, 1795) was a merchant when he arrived in the Quebec (formerly the French Colony of New France) in 1759. He became a land surveyor in 1764. He was appointed as Deputy Surveyor to the Office of Surveyor General of lands by Major Samuel Holland. The Office was created to meet the need for more accurate and detailed geographical information about the territory ceded to Great Britain in 1763.

He was responsible for surveying the international border along the 45th parallel between Quebec and New York. As time passed and colonial finances ran short, the Office of the Surveyor General began paying its certified surveyors with land grants. After completing surveys in large unsettled areas, Collins often petitioned for land, acquiring several parcels in Ontario and Quebec.

Little is known of Collins' private life, but he was married to Margaret, who died in Quebec on January 24, 1770. They had a daughter, Mary, who married another surveyor, James Rankin.

Collins died on April 15, 1795. Rue Collins in Quebec City is named after him, as is Collins Bay, Ontario.
