= Cantores Minores (Warsaw) =

Polish choir

- Choir
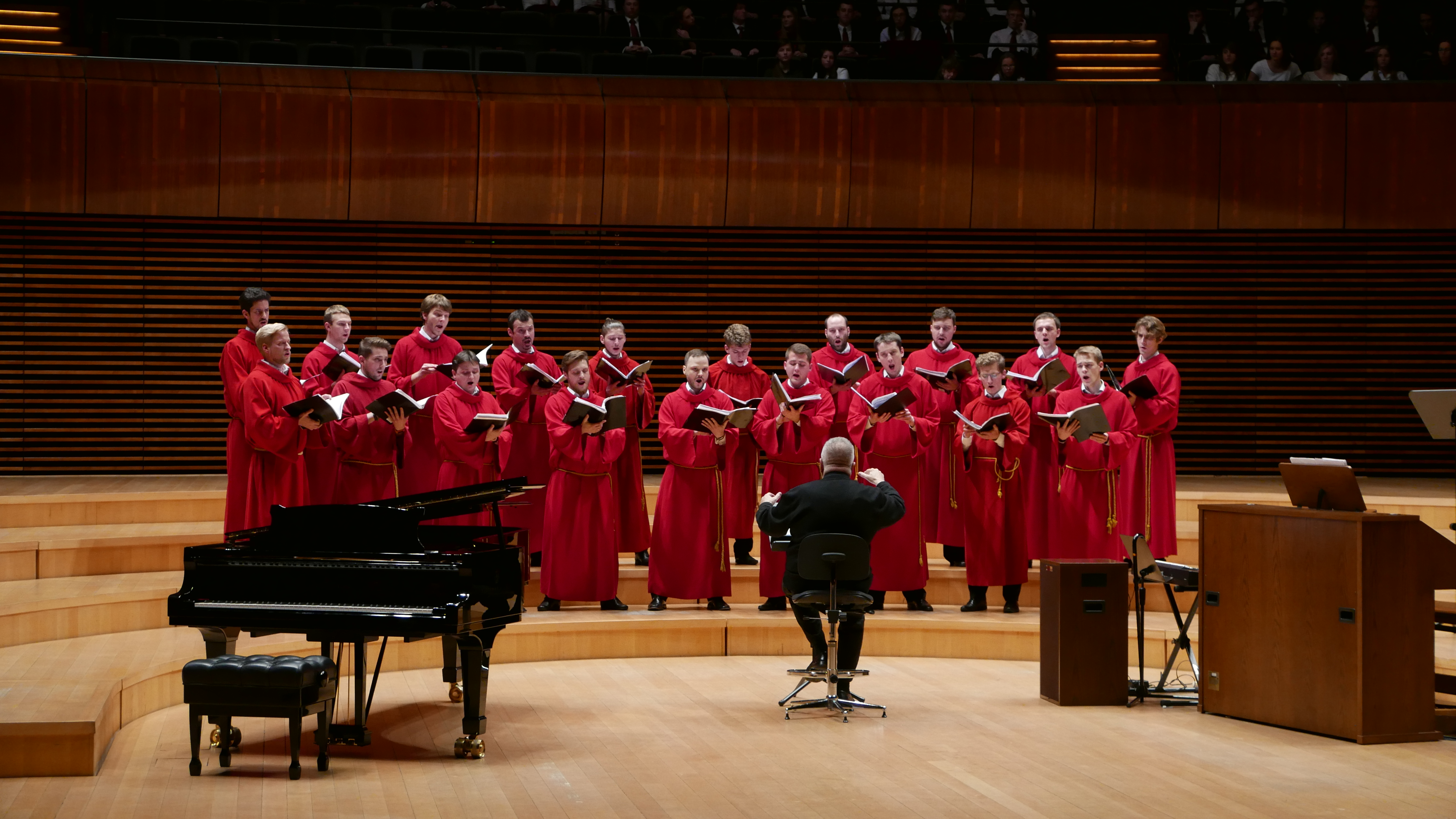
- Founded: 1990 (35 years ago)
- Founder: Joseph A. Herter
- Chief conductor: Joseph A. Herter (1990–2016); Franciszek Kubicki (2016-present)
- Headquarters: Warsaw
- Affiliation: St. John’s Archcathedral in Warsaw
- Website: cantoresminores.pl

Cantores Minores is a Polish male voice choir established in 1990 and affiliated with St. John’s Archcathedral in Warsaw.

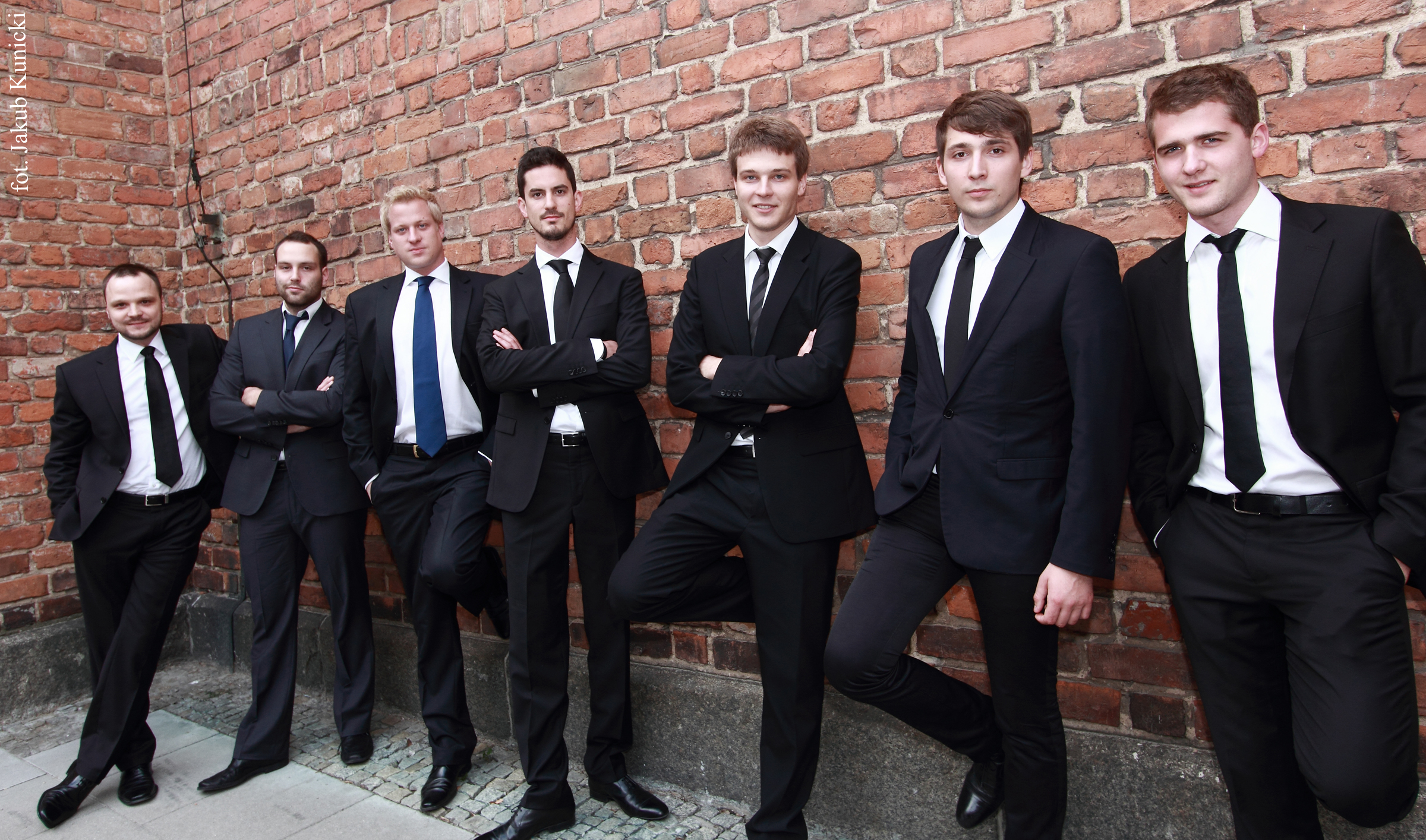
Cantores Minores (2016)

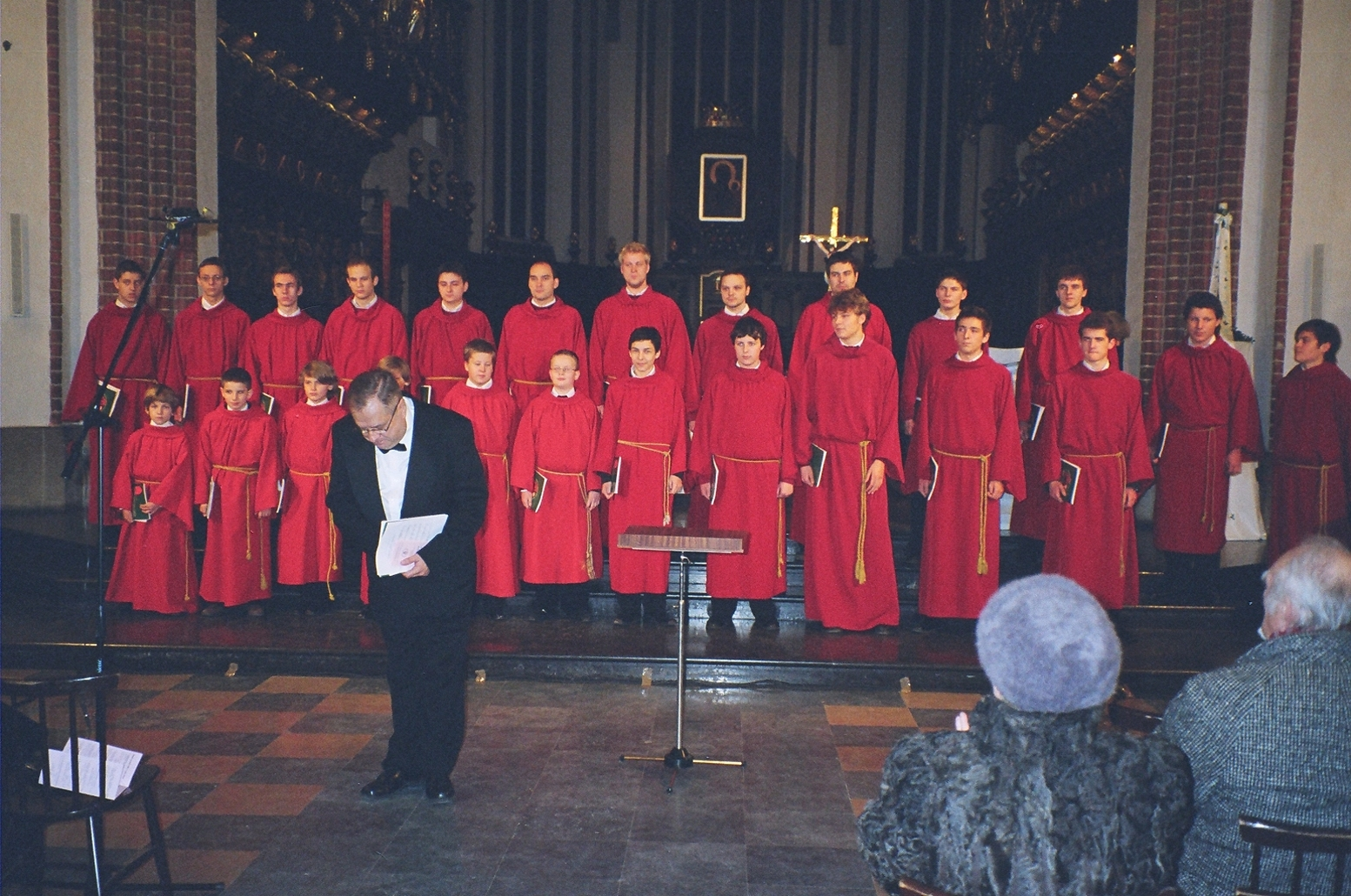
Cantores Minores (2007)

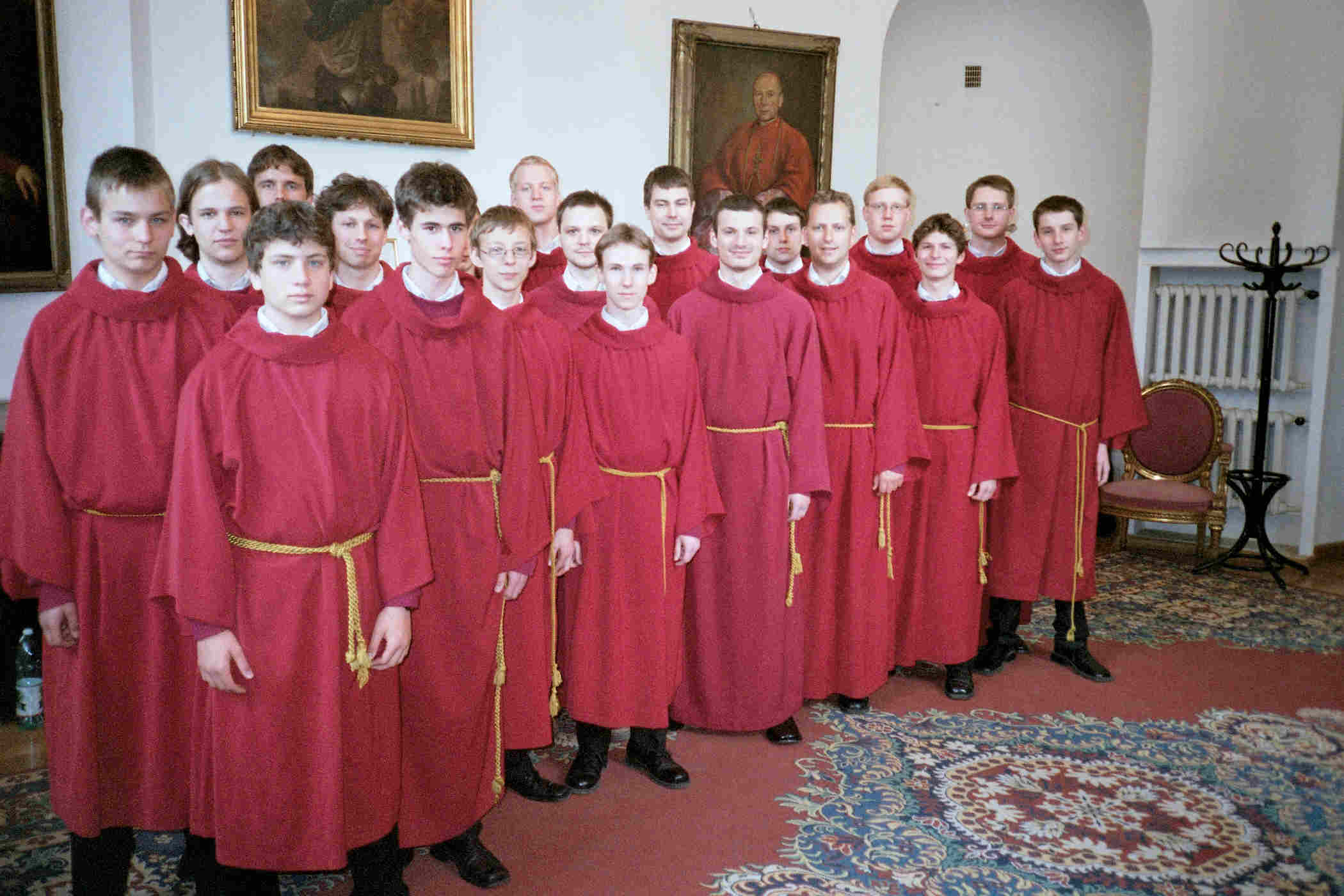
Cantores Minores (2004)

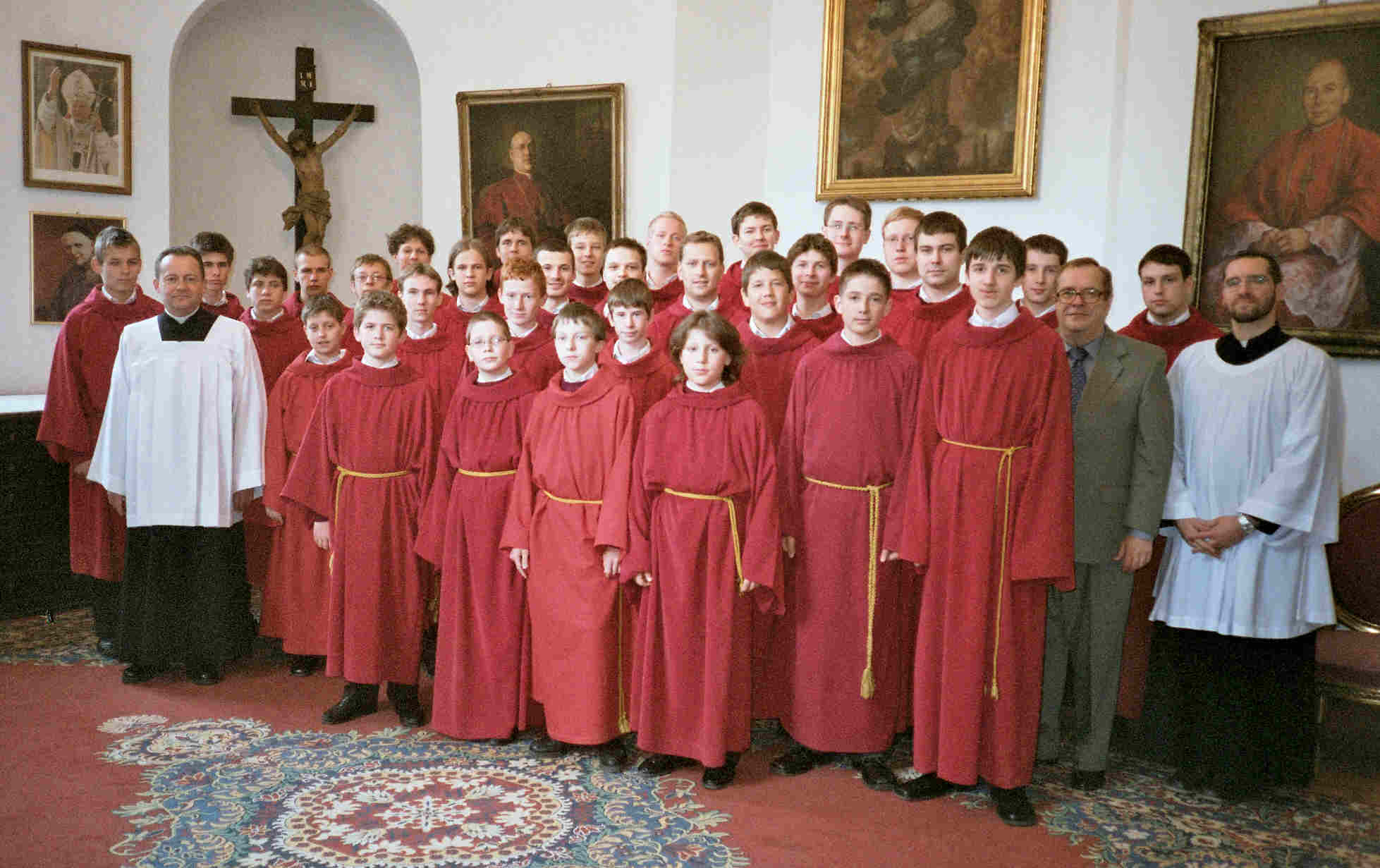
Cantores Minores (2004)

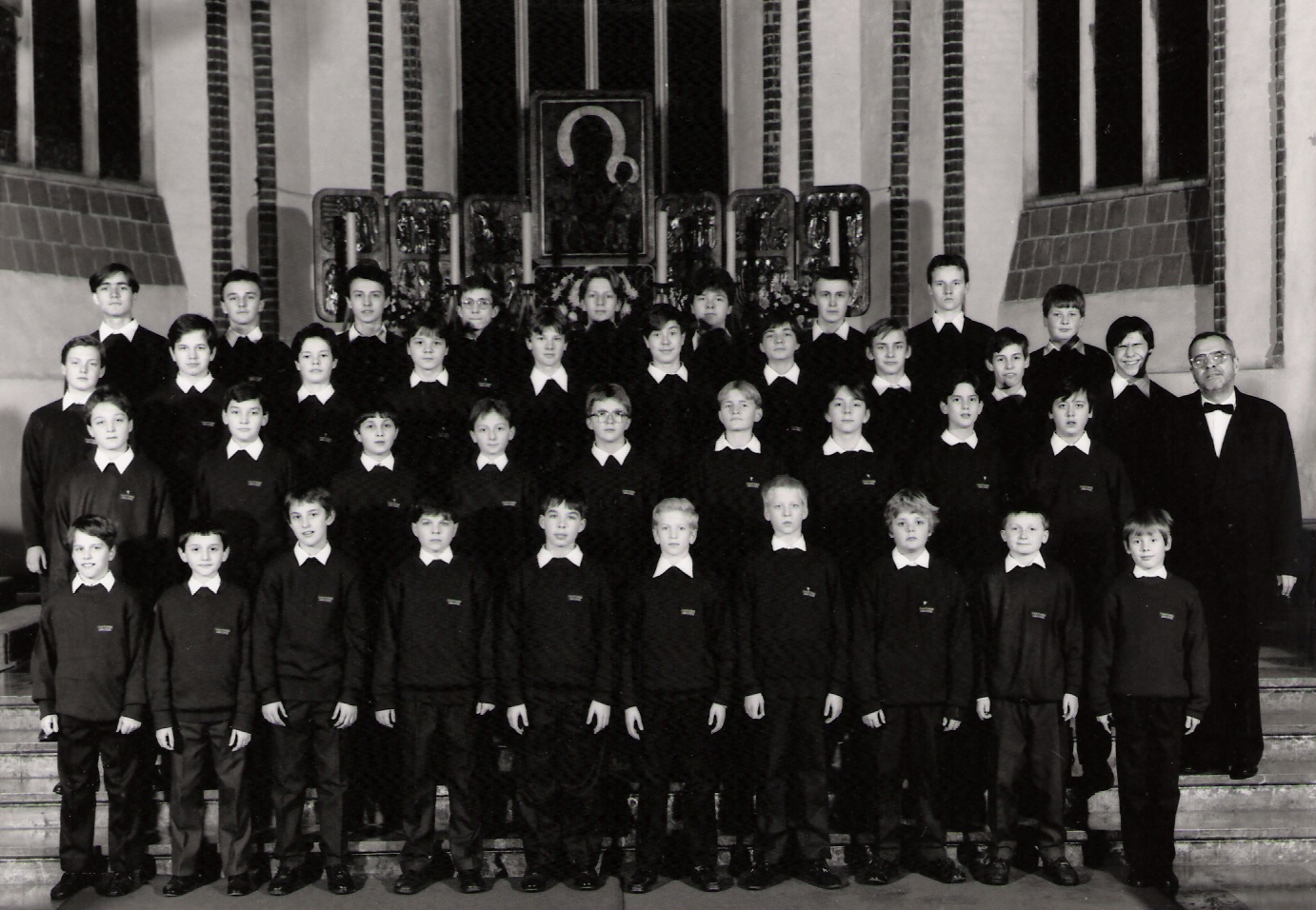
Cantores Minores (1993)

== History ==
Cantores Minores was founded in 1990 by Joseph A. Herter, with the help of Ryszard Gieros and Alfred Stefankiewicz. From almost the very beginning, it has been affiliated with St. John’s Archcathedral in Warsaw. In 2016, Ryszard Gieros was replaced by Henryk Grocholski, a long-time member of the choir, as President of the Board of the Cantores Minores Choral Association. Another long-time member of the choir, Franciszek Kubicki, took over the post of conductor, with Jakub Szafrański as his assistant. Joseph Herter received the title 'Honorary Conductor – Founder of Cantores Minores' and Ryszard Gieros – 'Honorary President of the Board – Founder of Cantores Minores'.

== Repertoire ==
The choir has a broad repertoire including Gregorian chant, a cappella sacred works (for Lent and Advent, Passion songs, Christmas carols), sacred compositions with the accompaniment of organ and other instruments, as well as patriotic and popular songs.

The choir sings at the 11:00 a.m. Mass at St. John’s Archcathedral every fourth Sunday of the month as well as during major church holidays. They also perform at religious ceremonies in other churches, as well as at various cultural events.

== Achievements and important events ==
In addition to singing at the celebrations of Sunday Mass, the choir has performed with many Polish symphony orchestras, including the Warsaw Philharmonic and Sinfonia Varsovia, as well as with such foreign orchestras such as The Academy of the London Mozarteum, Orchestre des pays de la Loire and Berliner Symphoniker. Foreign tours have taken the choir to over 20 countries in Europe and the United States.

They have won numerous awards at international choral competitions, including those in Lecco, Italy (1997), Moscow (2000), Prague (2002, 2003, 2004), Międzyzdroje, Poland (2004) and Warsaw (2013, 2015, 2016). In the autumn of 2016, they won First Prize at the 12th Varsovia Cantat International Festival (in the chamber choirs category).

Highlights in the activities of the choir have included a concert at the Vatican's Sala Nervi televised by Rai Uno and broadcast live by Eurovision (2000), and a concert in Strasbourg to mark the European Day of Cultural Dialogue, shown by the French TV cable station Mezzo in almost 40 countries (2008). In 2012, six members of the choir were invited to perform with the internationally famous jazz musician Bobby McFerrin in Warsaw.

== Professional Organizations ==
Cantores Minores is a member of the Polish Union of Choruses and Orchestras and of the Polish branch of Pueri Cantores, an international federation of church choirs originally established for boys and men.
