= Saint-Cergue =

- Municipality
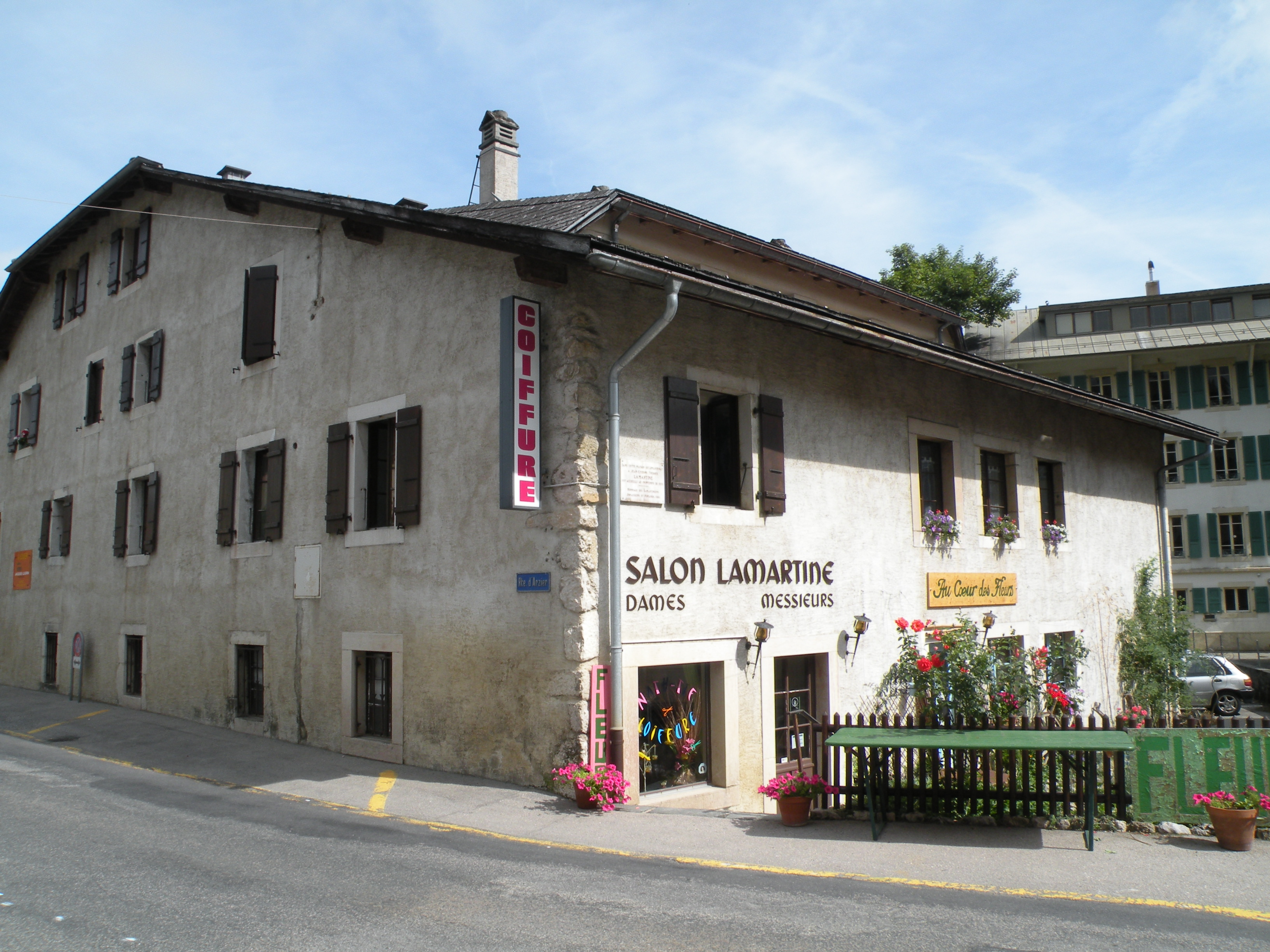
- Saint-Cergue village

- Flag Coat of arms
- Location of Saint-Cergue
- Location within Switzerland Location within Canton of Vaud
- Coordinates: 46°27′N 6°9′E
- Country: Switzerland
- Canton: Vaud
- District: Nyon

Government
  - Mayor: Syndic

Area
  - Total: 24.3 km^{2} (9.4 sq mi)
- Elevation: 1,041 m (3,415 ft)

Population (2003)
  - Total: 1,739
  - Density: 71.6/km^{2} (185/sq mi)
- Time zone: UTC+01:00 (CET)
  - Summer (DST): UTC+02:00 (CEST)
- Postal code: 1264
- SFOS number: 5727
- ISO 3166 code: CH-VD
- Surrounded by: Arzier, Gingins, Givrins, Les Rousses (FR-39), Prémanon (FR-39), Trélex
- Website: www.st-cergue.ch

Saint-Cergue is a municipality in the district of Nyon in the canton of Vaud in Switzerland.

== History ==
Saint-Cergue is first mentioned in 1110 as ecclesiam Sancti Cyrici.

== Geography ==
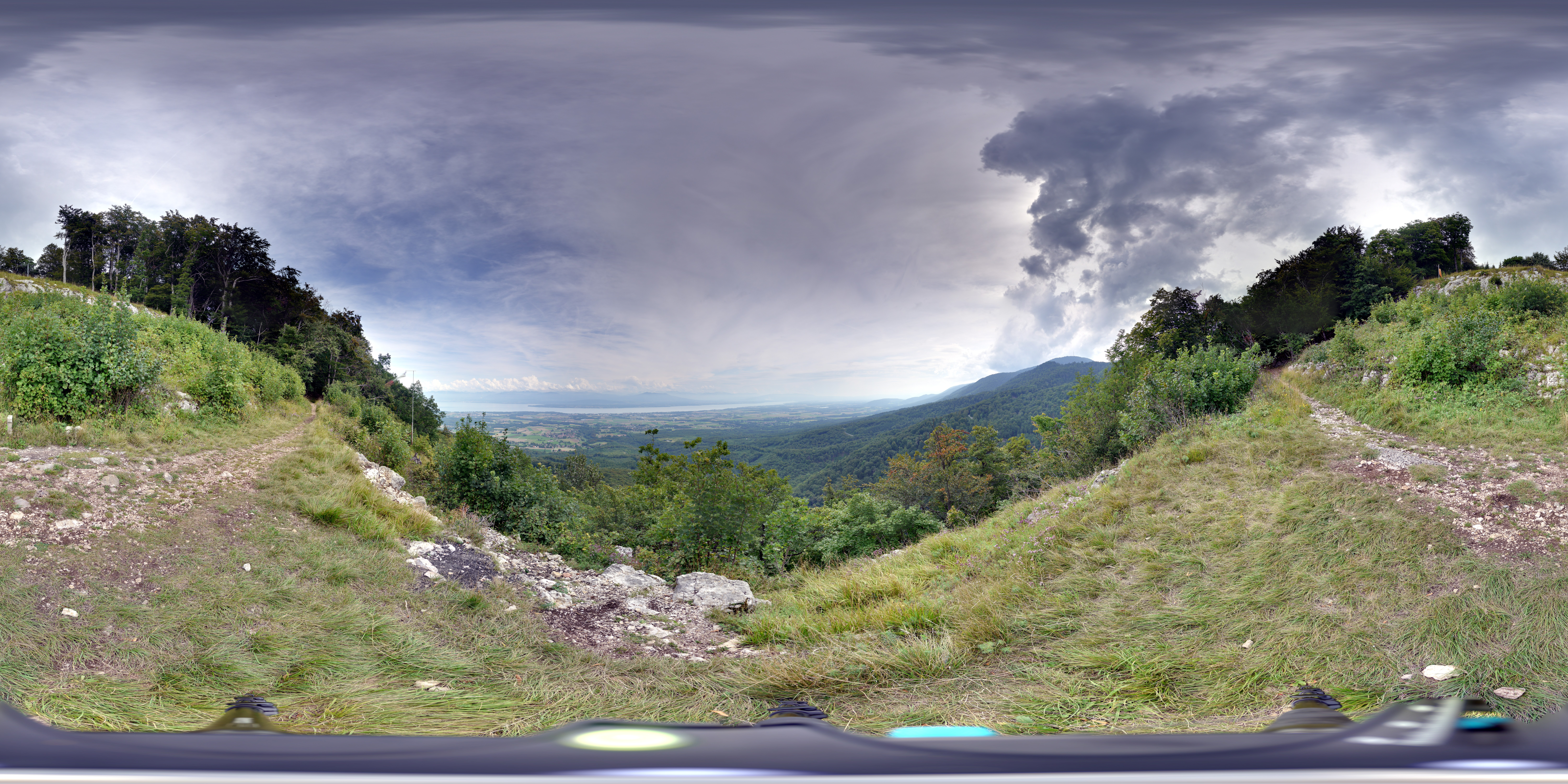
Panorama of the Saint-Cergue valley (view as a 360° interactive panorama)

Couvaloup Panorama

Aerial view (1964)

Saint-Cergue has an area, as of 2009, of 24.3 square kilometers (9.4 mi^{2}). Of this area, 6.71 km^{2} (2.59 mi^{2}) or 27.6% is used for agricultural purposes, while 16.02 km^{2} (6.19 mi^{2}) or 66.0% is forested. Of the rest of the land, 1.41 km^{2} (0.54 mi^{2}) or 5.8% is settled (buildings or roads) and 0.13 km^{2} (32 acres) or 0.5% is unproductive land.

Of the built up area, housing and buildings made up 3.3% and transportation infrastructure made up 2.2%. Out of the forested land, 62.6% of the total land area is heavily forested and 3.4% is covered with orchards or small clusters of trees. Of the agricultural land, 0.0% is used for growing crops and 2.1% is pastures and 25.5% is used for alpine pastures.

The municipality was part of the Nyon District until it was dissolved on 31 August 2006, and Saint-Cergue became part of the new district of Nyon.

The municipality is located in the Nyon district, on the road over the Col de la Givrine. The town consists of the village of Saint-Cergue and of the part of the hamlet of La Cure which since the treaty of Dappes of 1862 belongs to Switzerland and straddles the Swiss-French border.

== Coat of arms ==
The blazon of the municipal coat of arms is Per pale Or and Gules, dexter a tower Sable lined Argent crowned with a Mullet of Five Argent, sinister a Pine-tree vert, both on overall a Mount Vert.

== Demographics ==
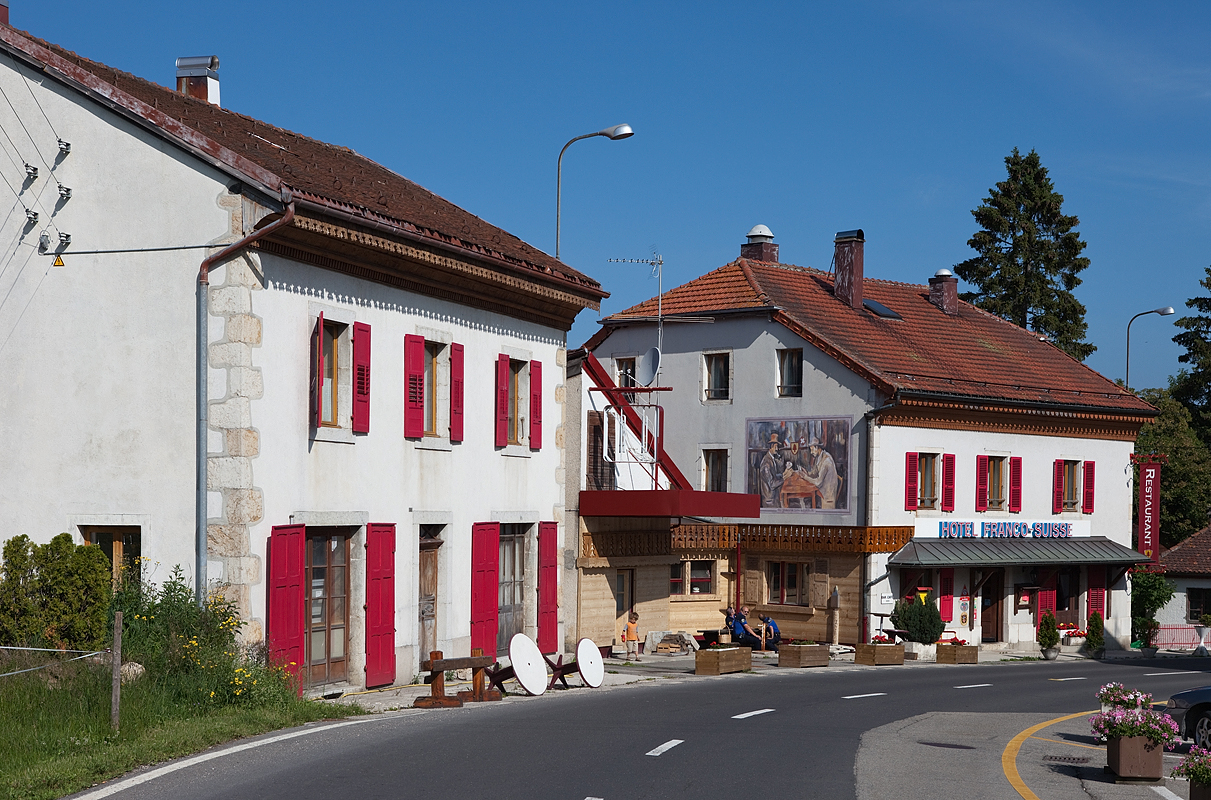
Hotel Franco-Swiss at the French-Swiss border

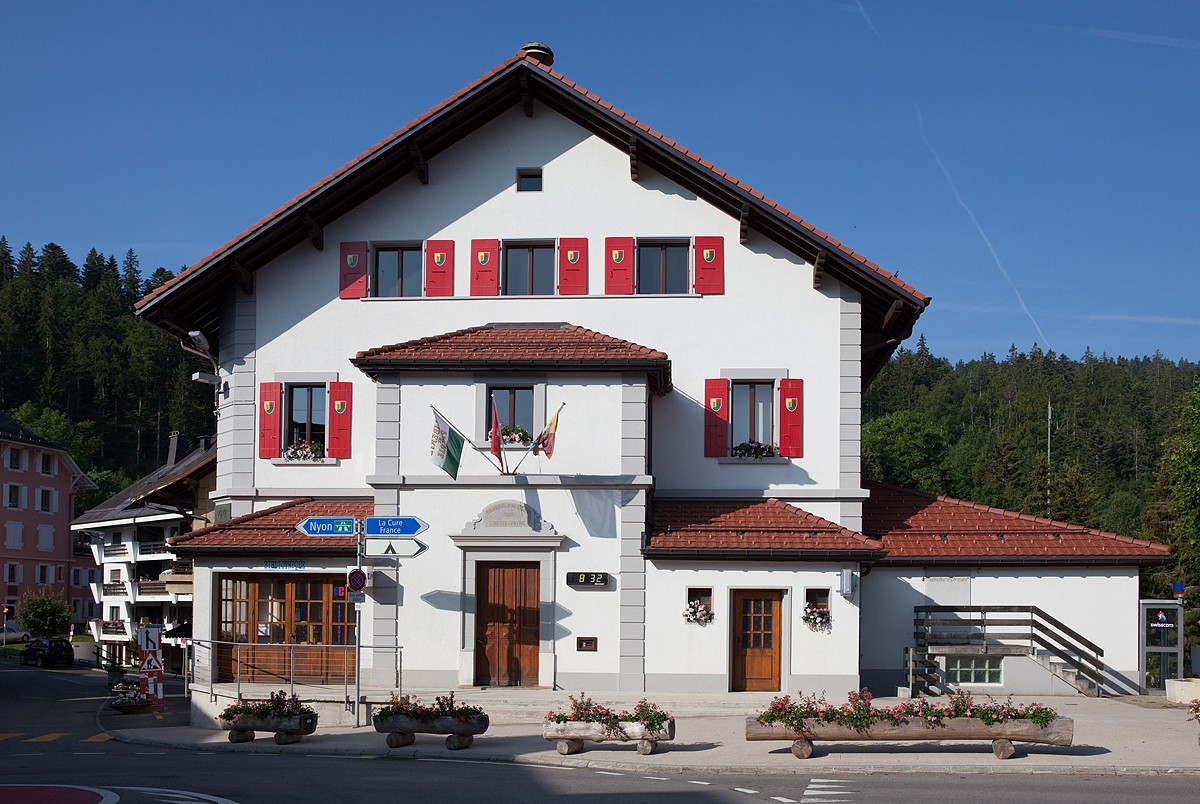
Town hall of Saint-Cergue

Saint-Cergue has a population (as of December 2020) of 2,674. As of 2008, 27.6% of the population are resident foreign nationals. Over the last 10 years (1999–2009 ) the population has changed at a rate of 25.1%. It has changed at a rate of 21.3% due to migration and at a rate of 3.9% due to births and deaths.

Most of the population (as of 2000) speaks French (1,379 or 86.1%), with German being second most common (79 or 4.9%) and English being third (67 or 4.2%). There are 15 people who speak Italian and 2 people who speak Romansh.

The age distribution, as of 2009, in Saint-Cergue is; 158 children or 8.1% of the population are between 0 and 9 years old and 259 teenagers or 13.3% are between 10 and 19. Of the adult population, 195 people or 10.0% of the population are between 20 and 29 years old. 215 people or 11.1% are between 30 and 39, 431 people or 22.2% are between 40 and 49, and 291 people or 15.0% are between 50 and 59. The senior population distribution is 222 people or 11.4% of the population are between 60 and 69 years old, 99 people or 5.1% are between 70 and 79, there are 62 people or 3.2% who are between 80 and 89, and there are 12 people or 0.6% who are 90 and older.

As of 2000, there were 637 people who were single and never married in the municipality. There were 791 married individuals, 45 widows or widowers and 128 individuals who are divorced.

As of 2000, there were 653 private households in the municipality, and an average of 2.3 persons per household. There were 203 households that consist of only one person and 39 households with five or more people. Out of a total of 677 households that answered this question, 30.0% were households made up of just one person and there were 3 adults who lived with their parents. Of the rest of the households, there are 191 married couples without children, 203 married couples with children. There were 40 single parents with a child or children. There were 13 households that were made up of unrelated people and 24 households that were made up of some sort of institution or another collective housing.

In 2000 there were 630 single family homes (or 77.8% of the total) out of a total of 810 inhabited buildings. There were 105 multi-family buildings (13.0%), along with 26 multi-purpose buildings that were mostly used for housing (3.2%) and 49 other use buildings (commercial or industrial) that also had some housing (6.0%).

In 2000, a total of 626 apartments (46.3% of the total) were permanently occupied, while 643 apartments (47.5%) were seasonally occupied and 84 apartments (6.2%) were empty. As of 2009, the construction rate of new housing units was 2 new units per 1000 residents. The vacancy rate for the municipality, in 2010, was 4.41%.

The historical population is given in the following chart:

== Twin Town ==
Saint-Cergue is twinned with the town of Ferrières, Belgium.

== Politics ==
In the 2007 federal election the most popular party was the SVP which received 25.92% of the vote. The next three most popular parties were the SP (22.04%), the Green Party (14.79%) and the FDP (8.43%). In the federal election, a total of 386 votes were cast, and the voter turnout was 35.9%.

== Economy ==
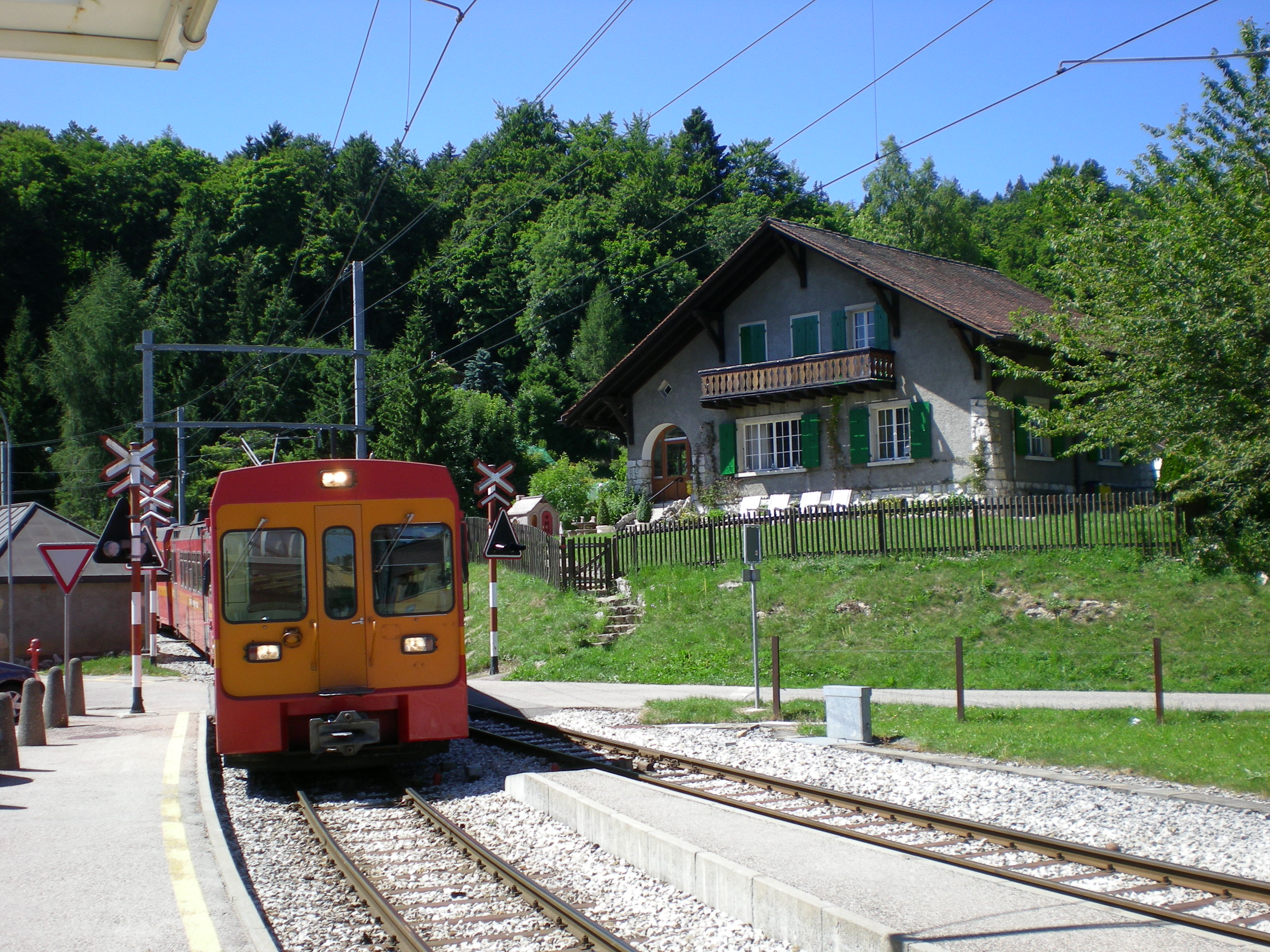
Train at Saint-Cergue station

As of 2010, Saint-Cergue had an unemployment rate of 7.6%. As of 2008, there were 13 people employed in the primary economic sector and about 2 businesses involved in this sector. 42 people were employed in the secondary sector and there were 12 businesses in this sector. 209 people were employed in the tertiary sector, with 60 businesses in this sector. There were 816 residents of the municipality who were employed in some capacity, of which females made up 40.4% of the workforce.

In 2008 the total number of full-time equivalent jobs was 223. The number of jobs in the primary sector was 10, of which were in agriculture and 10 were in forestry or lumber production. The number of jobs in the secondary sector was 40 of which 3 or (7.5%) were in manufacturing and 37 (92.5%) were in construction. The number of jobs in the tertiary sector was 173. In the tertiary sector; 37 or 21.4% were in wholesale or retail sales or the repair of motor vehicles, 17 or 9.8% were in the movement and storage of goods, 34 or 19.7% were in a hotel or restaurant, 4 or 2.3% were in the information industry, 1 was the insurance or financial industry, 10 or 5.8% were technical professionals or scientists, 37 or 21.4% were in education and 9 or 5.2% were in health care.

In 2000, there were 184 workers who commuted into the municipality and 592 workers who commuted away. The municipality is a net exporter of workers, with about 3.2 workers leaving the municipality for every one entering. About 34.2% of the workforce coming into Saint-Cergue are coming from outside Switzerland, while 0.7% of the locals commute out of Switzerland for work. Of the working population, 13.6% used public transportation to get to work, and 69.4% used a private car.

== Transport ==
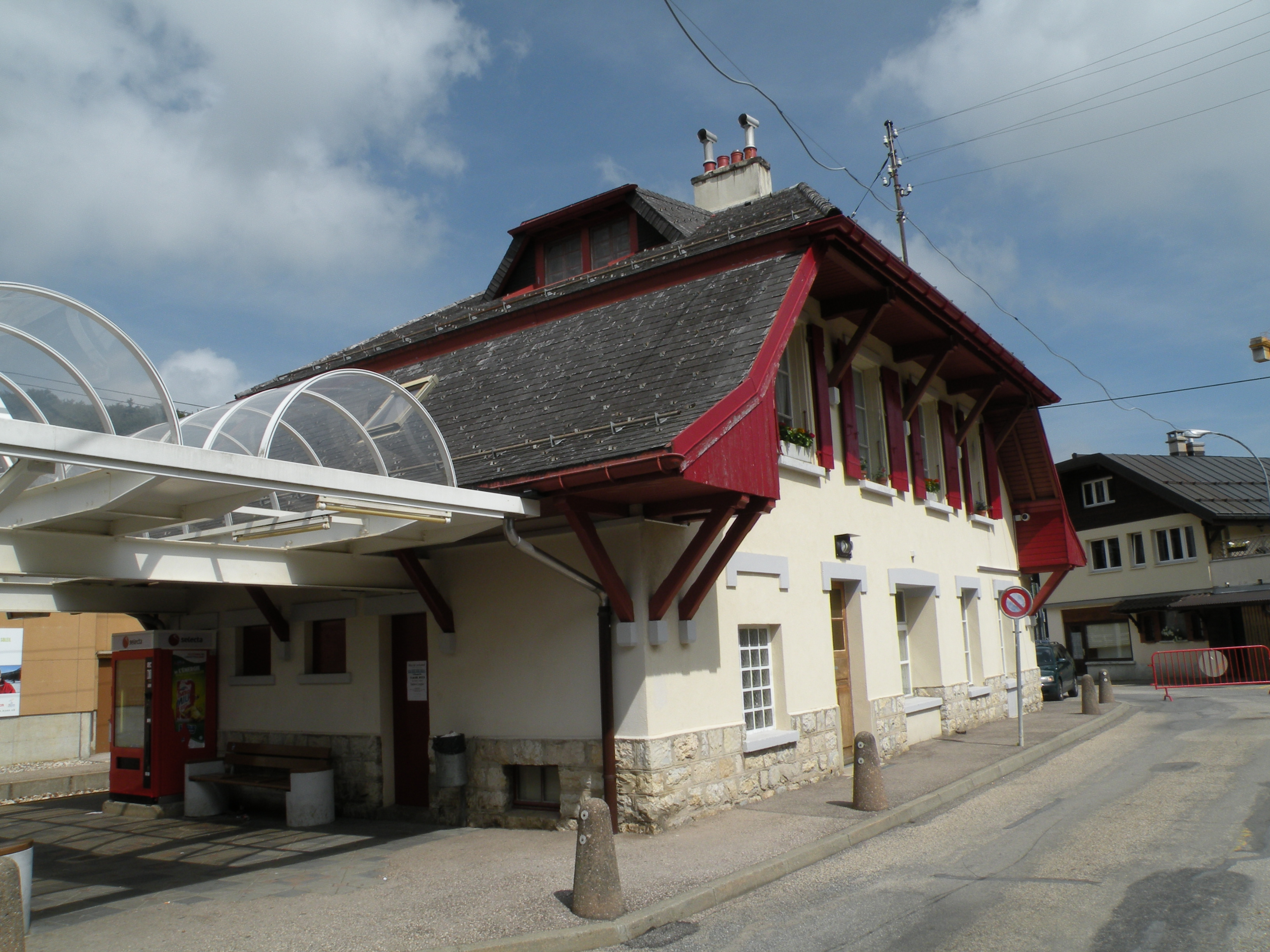
Saint-Cergue train station

Saint-Cergue is served by a station on the Nyon–St-Cergue–Morez Railway, a Metre-gauge railway operating between La Cure and Nyon.

== Religion ==
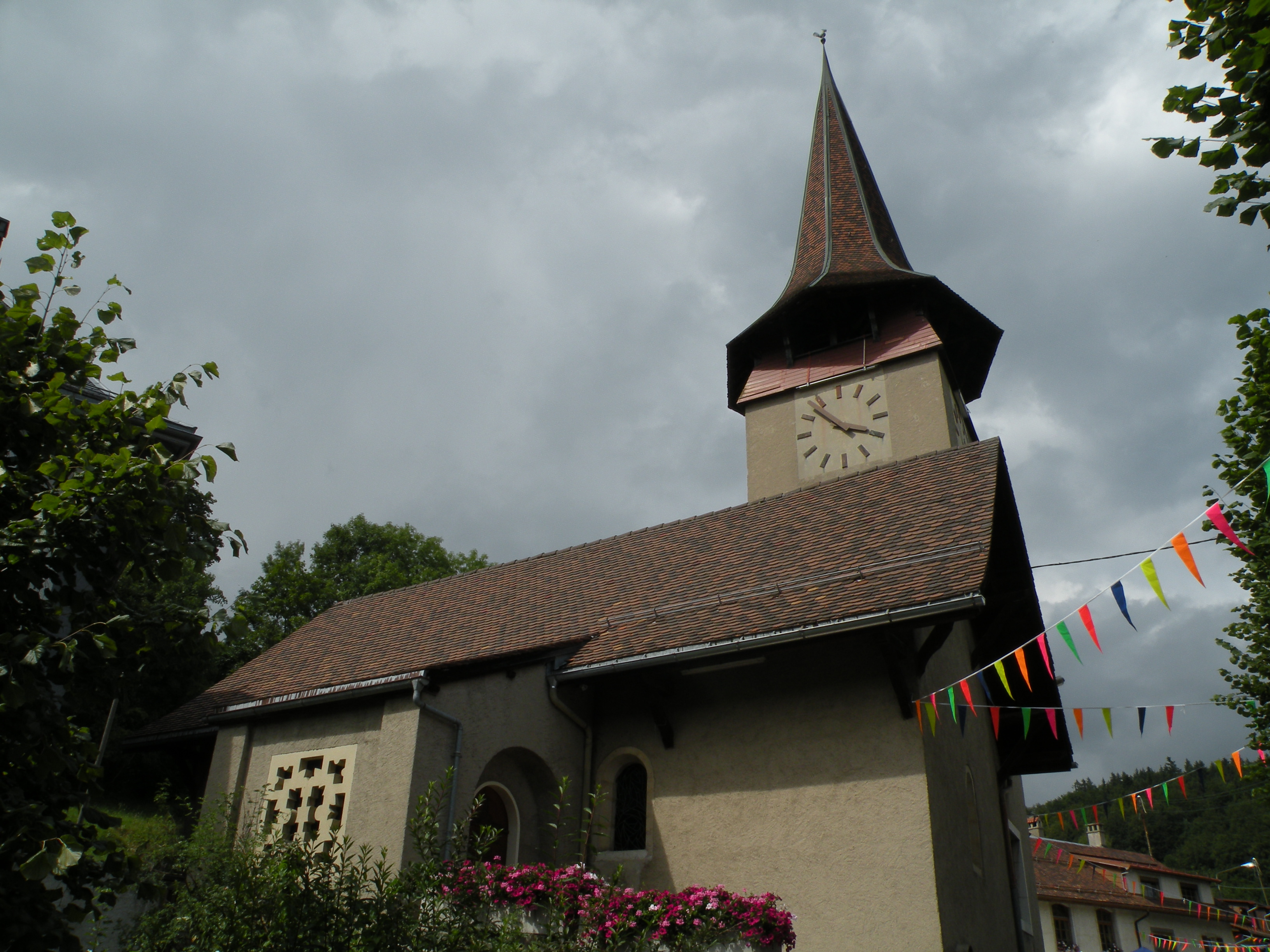
Church in Saint-Cergue

From the 2000 census, 487 or 30.4% were Roman Catholic, while 491 or 30.7% belonged to the Swiss Reformed Church. Of the rest of the population, there were 15 members of an Orthodox church (or about 0.94% of the population), and there were 122 individuals (or about 7.62% of the population) who belonged to another Christian church. There were 11 individuals (or about 0.69% of the population) who were Jewish, and 9 (or about 0.56% of the population) who were Islamic. There were 2 individuals who were Buddhist and 5 individuals who belonged to another church. 437 (or about 27.30% of the population) belonged to no church, are agnostic or atheist, and 75 individuals (or about 4.68% of the population) did not answer the question.

== Education ==
In Saint-Cergue about 560 or (35.0%) of the population have completed non-mandatory upper secondary education, and 291 or (18.2%) have completed additional higher education (either university or a Fachhochschule). Of the 291 who completed tertiary schooling, 35.7% were Swiss men, 25.4% were Swiss women, 26.8% were non-Swiss men and 12.0% were non-Swiss women.

In the 2009/2010 school year there were a total of 213 students in the Saint-Cergue school district. In the Vaud cantonal school system, two years of non-obligatory pre-school are provided by the political districts. During the school year, the political district provided pre-school care for a total of 1,249 children of which 563 children (45.1%) received subsidized pre-school care. The canton's primary school program requires students to attend for four years. There were 101 students in the municipal primary school program. The obligatory lower secondary school program lasts for six years and there were 109 students in those schools. There were also 3 students who were home schooled or attended another non-traditional school.

As of 2000, there were 26 students in Saint-Cergue who came from another municipality, while 186 residents attended schools outside the municipality.
