= Hotel Arbez =

Hotel on the France–Switzerland border

Coordinates: 46.4643°N 6.0730°E

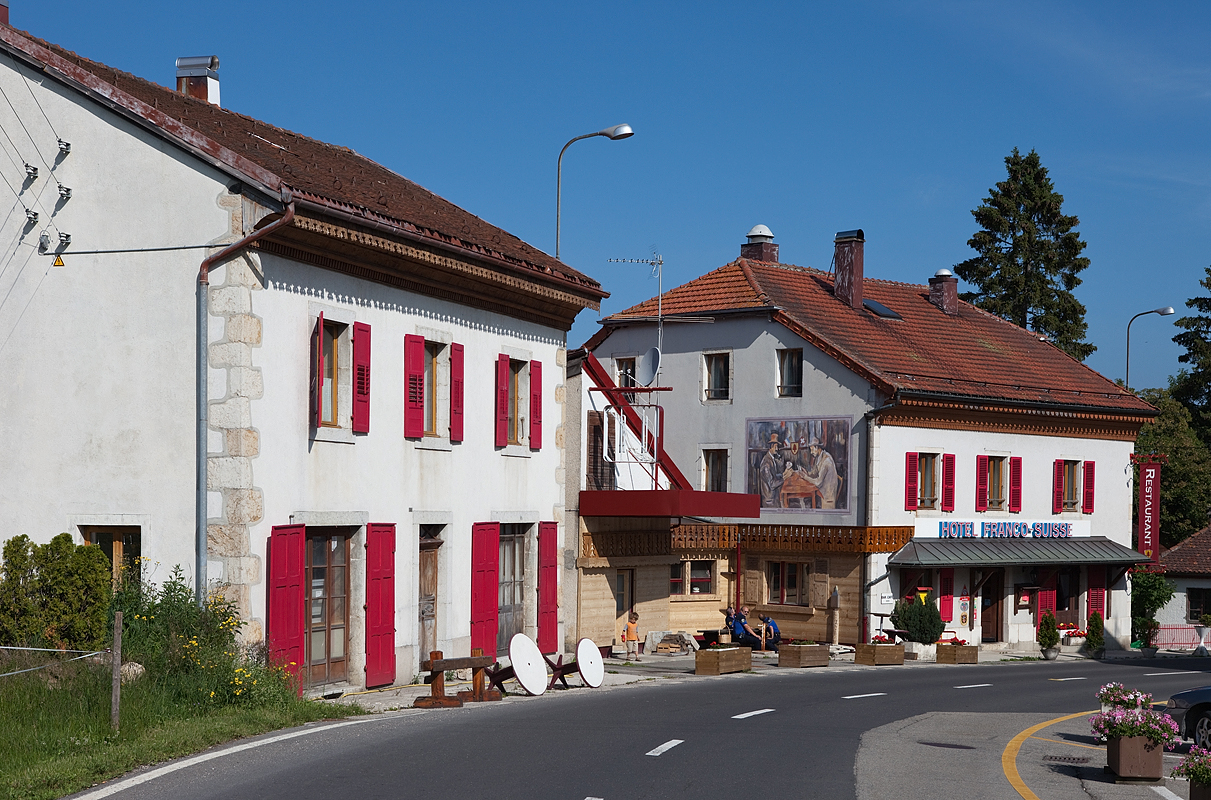
Hotel Arbez in La Cure. The border runs lengthwise through the two buildings, passing just to the left of the mural. The mural and everything to the right of it lies in Switzerland; France lies to the left.

The Hotel Arbez, also called the Hôtel Arbez Franco-Suisse or L'Arbézie, is a hotel that straddles the international border between France and Switzerland in the tiny village of La Cure, which is itself divided by the boundary. Built by a private landowner and businessman specially to take advantage of an impending border adjustment between the two countries, the structure was originally used as a grocery store (its Swiss portion) and a pub (the French half). Today, the entire building houses a hotel, whose dining room, kitchen and several rooms are bisected by the boundary.

== Background ==
The unusual situation of the Hotel Arbez grew out of a dispute between France and Switzerland over possession of the Vallée des Dappes, just south and west of the tiny town of La Cure. Though the valley had little value as a territorial possession, it provided an accessible military route between France and Savoy. Annexed by Napoleonic France in 1802, it was returned to Switzerland by the Congress of Vienna, though the French continued to call for its retrocession. After several attempts to acquire the area were rebuffed by the Swiss, France decided in 1862 to offer a nearby section of its own territory, comparable in size, in exchange. The Swiss agreed, and a treaty was signed in Bern, by which slightly less than 8 square kilometres (3 sq mi) changed hands. While La Cure had previously been located entirely within France, the new boundary was slated to cut the village—including some residences and a pub—in half. The treaty stipulated that any already existing structure bisected by the border was to be left undisturbed, and this gave one local businessman an idea.

== Construction of the hotel ==
At the time of the signing of the treaty in December 1862, the land currently occupied by the Hotel Arbez was owned by a French citizen named Ponthus. Taking advantage of the provision about leaving undisturbed previously-existing buildings bisected by the new boundary, coupled with the delay in ratification by the Swiss Parliament, he hurriedly erected a three-story structure in a location that would straddle the border, with approximately one-third in what would become Swiss territory, and the remaining two-thirds in France. Hoping to take advantage of the new cross-border traffic, he opened a grocery store in the Swiss portion of the building and a bar in the French section. By 1921, Ponthus's heirs had fallen on hard times, and the building was sold to Jules-Jean Arbez, who remodeled it and reopened it as a hotel.

== World War II and afterwards ==
During the German occupation of France in World War II, German troops were allowed to enter the French side of the hotel, but were strictly prohibited from crossing to the Swiss side. Since the stairway to the upper floor started in French territory but ended in Switzerland (the border lies on the 7th step of the stairway) the Germans were not permitted to access any of the upper rooms, which became a refuge for refugees and French Resistance members. The owner at the time was Max Arbez, who along with his wife Angèle rescued Jews fleeing the Germans in occupied France. For this he was posthumously honoured as Righteous Among the Nations by Yad Vashem on April 22, 2012.

The hotel was chosen in 1962 for the initial (secret) contacts between the French government and the Algerian FLN (with the latter entering from the neutral Swiss side), which led to the negotiation of the Évian Accords between France and Algeria, which resulted in the independence of the latter.

== The Arbez today ==
Today, the Franco-Swiss border passes through the kitchen, dining room, hallway and several rooms of the Hotel Arbez:

- The dining room is divided by the boundary.
- The bar is entirely located in France, though the boundary passes just outside its front door.
- The bed in the honeymoon suite is bisected by the border, with half in France and half in Switzerland.
- The main hall and stairway are bisected by the border. The lower half of the stairs lie in France, the upper half, beginning on the seventh step is in Switzerland;
- Another room has its bathroom in France, while the rest of the room is in Switzerland.
- The annex to the hotel is located entirely in Switzerland.

In 1958, in a spirit of satire, Max Arbez declared the hotel a micronation called Arbézie. He designed a triangular flag to reflect the shape of the land and introduced a currency called the Arbézienne rupee. He proclaimed himself Prince Max I of Arbézie. In a similar vein, the Republic of Saugeais, located in Doubs a few dozen kilometers to the north, had been declared in 1947.

Max Arbez named French President Charles de Gaulle the first honorary citizen during his visit to La Cure. Friends such as Paul-Émile Victor and Bernard Clavel were also granted this distinction.

On December 9, 1961, the hotel hosted preliminary negotiations for the Évian Accords between representatives of France and the Algerian FLN to end the Algerian War. French diplomats entered from France, and Algerian representatives from Switzerland.

The hotel is still owned by the Arbez family.

Today, the Hotel Arbez is operated by the French company SARL Arbez Franco Suisse, which pays taxes equally to both countries. When the French government banned smoking in French pubs and restaurants in 2008, the rule was applied to both the Swiss and French sides of the dining room.

== See also ==
- Line house, a building that straddles an international boundary.
- Haskell Free Library and Opera House, a library located half in Derby Line, Vermont, United States, and half in Stanstead, Quebec, Canada.
- Paul VI Audience Hall, located partially in the Vatican City, but mostly in Rome, Italy: the Italian part of the building is treated as an extraterritorial area of the Holy See and is used by the Pope as an alternative to Saint Peter's Square when conducting his Wednesday morning General Audience.
- Baarle-Nassau and Baarle-Hertog, a town of two parts, with multiple complex exclaves of Belgium located within the territory of the Netherlands. Numerous buildings within Baarle are bisected by an international border.
