= La Cure =

Village on the France–Switzerland border

- Municipality
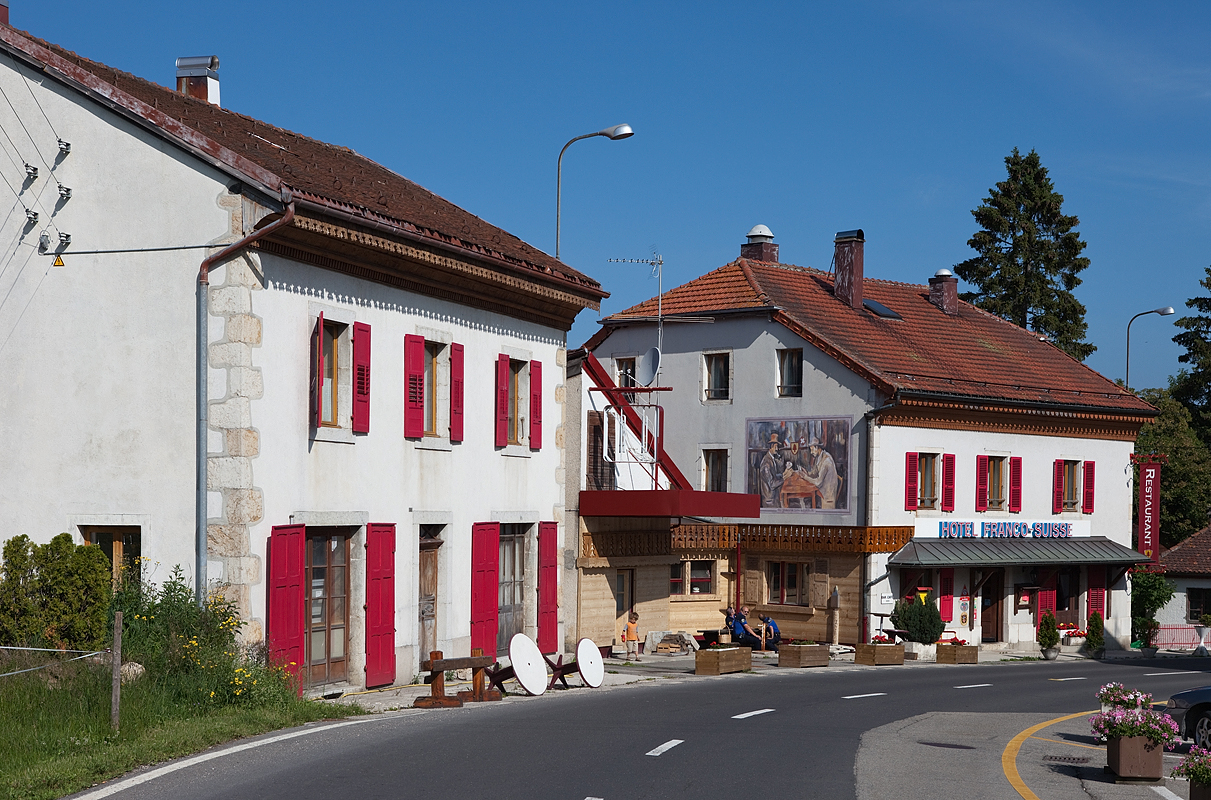
- Hotel Arbez in La Cure. The border runs lengthwise through the two buildings, passing just to the left of the mural. The mural and everything to the right of it lies in Switzerland; France lies to the left.
- Location of La Cure
- Location within Switzerland Location within Canton of Vaud
- Coordinates: 46°28′N 6°04′E
- Country: Switzerland
- Canton: Vaud
- District: Nyon
- Elevation: 1,028 m (3,373 ft)
- Time zone: UTC+01:00 (CET)
  - Summer (DST): UTC+02:00 (CEST)
- Postal code: 1265
- ISO 3166 code: CH-VD
- Website: website missing Profile (in French),

La Cure (French pronunciation: [la kyʁ]) is a village located some 20 kilometres (15 mi) northwest of Lake Geneva, straddling the Franco-Swiss border. Administratively, the Swiss half of La Cure is part of the municipality of Saint-Cergue, while the French half is part of the municipality of Les Rousses. The international border bisects at least four buildings, notably the Hotel Arbez, in which the dining hall and other rooms are bisected by the border.

== History ==
Until 1862, La Cure was entirely in France. France and Switzerland had previously disputed possession of the strategically important Vallée des Dappes, which was controlled by the latter until in 1862, the Swiss accepted an offer to exchange that territory for another piece just to the north and east; the new boundary was drawn directly through La Cure. According to the Treaty of Dappes, which formalized the swap, any buildings existing at the time that the new line was demarcated were not to be disturbed, even if the boundary bisected them.

Today, the border passes through the Hotel Arbez (see below); in addition, it bisects at least two residences, and a pub.

== Railway ==
There is a Swiss Railways narrow gauge railway line, the Nyon–St-Cergue–Morez Railway, that runs from Nyon to La Cure.

== Hotel Arbez ==
Taking advantage of the delay between negotiation of the treaty and its final ratification by the Swiss Parliament, a local businessman named Ponthus constructed a new structure in 1863 on the new borderline. Originally Ponthus operated a grocery store in the Swiss section of the building, with a bar in the French section, hoping to turn the cross-border business to his advantage. In 1921, Jules-Jean Arbez purchased the building, and turned it into a hotel.

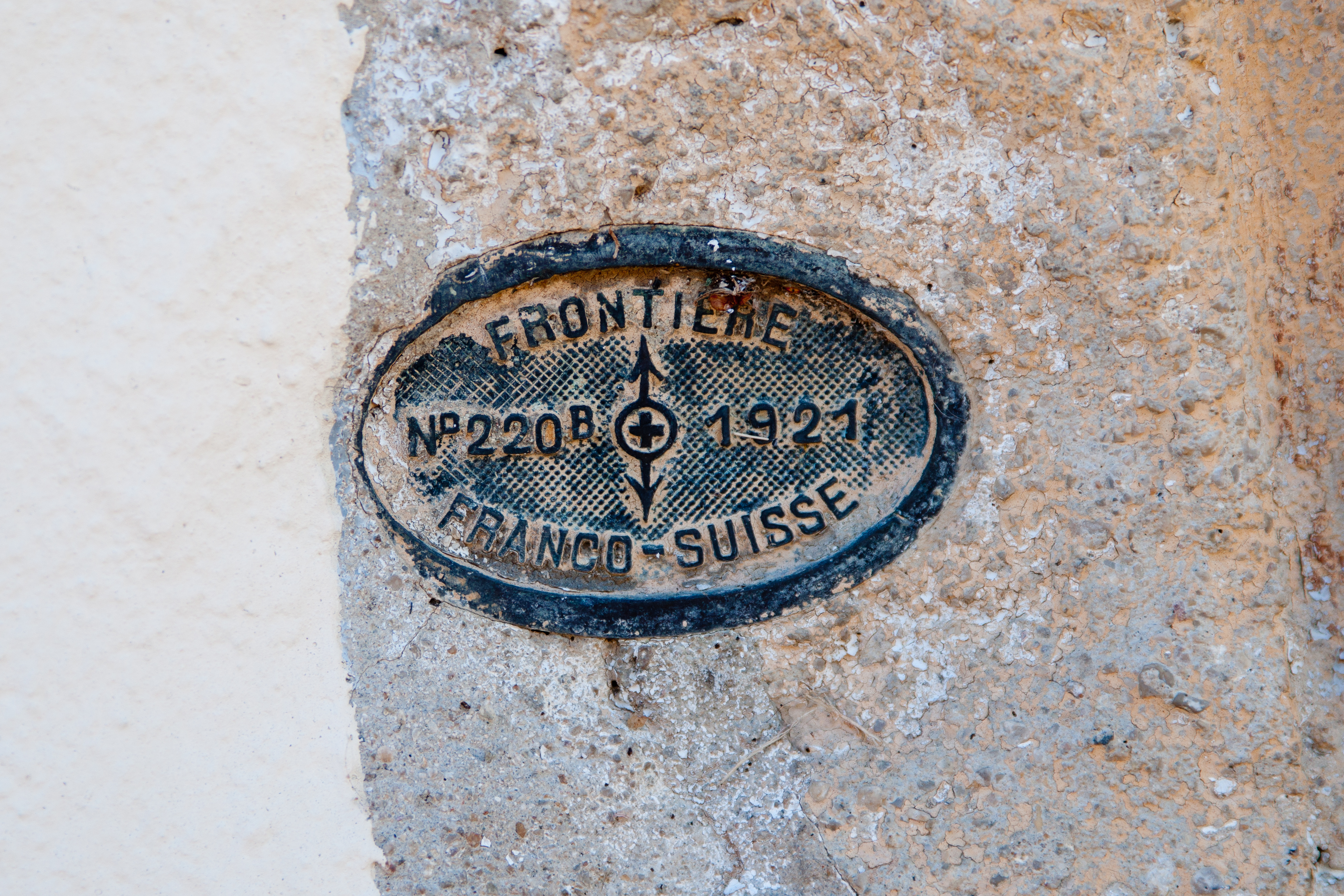
Border plaque on a building in La Cure

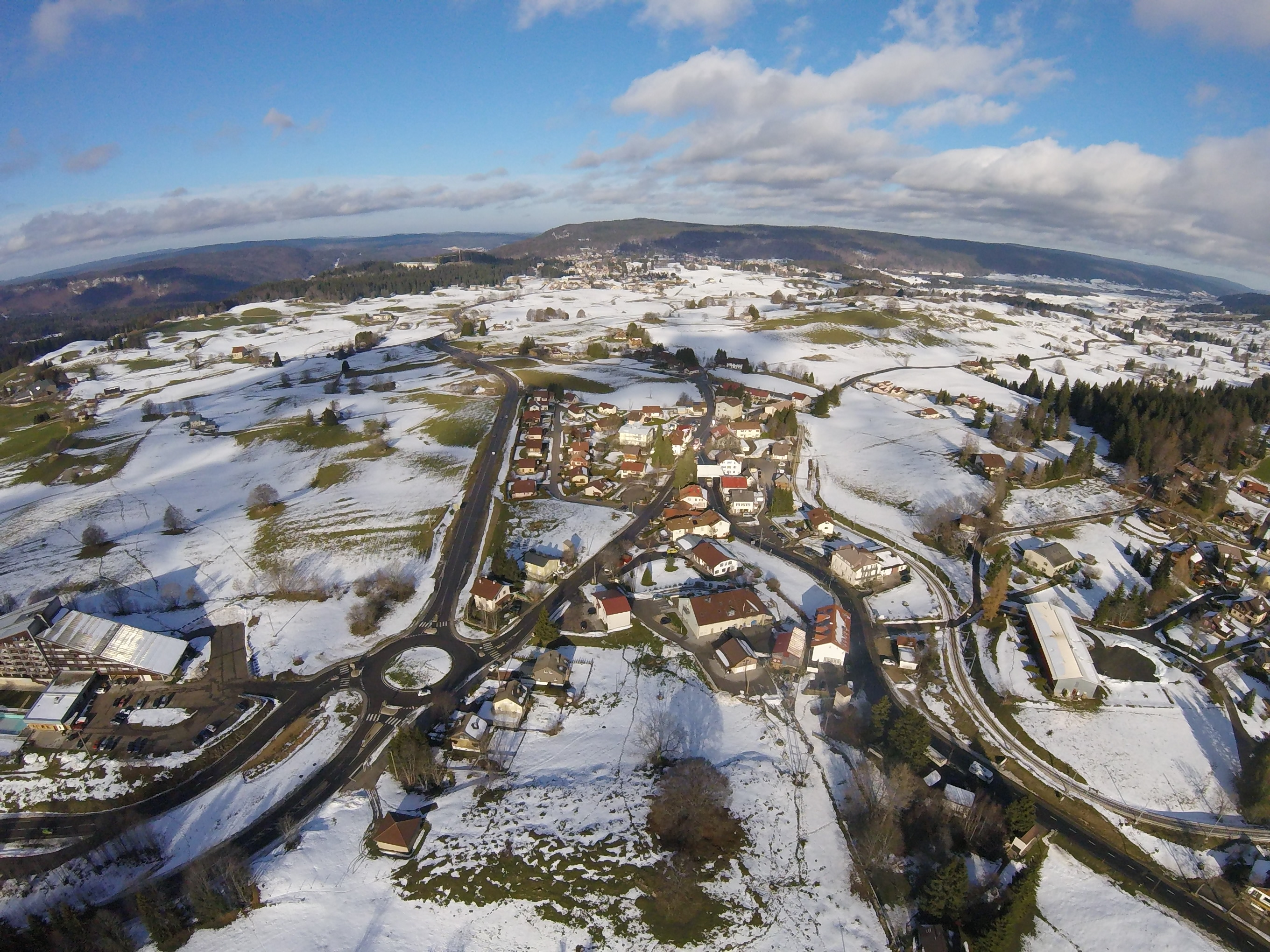
La Cure, aerial view.

Today, the Franco-Swiss border passes through the kitchen, dining room, hallway and several rooms of the hotel. In two rooms (including the honeymoon suite) the beds themselves are bisected by the boundary, while in another, the bathroom is in France, while the rest of the room is in Switzerland.

During the German occupation of France in World War II, their troops were allowed to enter the French side of the hotel, but were strictly prohibited from crossing to the Swiss side. Since the stairway to the upper floor started in French territory but ended in Switzerland, the Germans were not permitted to access any of the upper rooms, which became a refuge for refugees and French Resistance members. The hotel was chosen in 1962 for negotiation of the Évian Accords between France and Algeria, which resulted in the independence of the latter.

== In literature ==
La Cure and the Hotel Arbez are plot devices in Ben Lerner's 2026 novel Transcription.

== See also ==
- Haskell Free Library and Opera House, a library located half in Derby Line, Vermont, United States and half in Stanstead, Quebec, Canada.
- Paul VI Audience Hall, located partially in the Vatican City, but mostly in Rome, Italy: the Italian part of the building is treated as an extraterritorial area of the Holy See and is used by the Pope as an alternative to Saint Peter's Square when conducting his Wednesday morning General Audience.
