= The Resurrection (Fazzini) =

1977 sculpture by Pericle Fazzini

The Resurrection (La Resurrezione) is a bronze and brass sculpture by Pericle Fazzini in the Paul VI Audience Hall in Rome. Intended to capture the anguish of 20th century mankind living under the threat of nuclear war, La Resurrezione depicts Jesus rising from a nuclear crater in the Garden of Gethsemane. Fazzini summarized the action of the statue as "Christ rises from this crater torn open by a nuclear bomb; an atrocious explosion, a vortex of violence and energy."

The sculpture's dimensions are 66 ft × 23 ft × 10 ft (20.1 m × 7.0 m × 3.0 m). It weighs 30 tons and cost $400,000. The commission for the work was ordered by Count Galeassi in 1965; casting began at the Michelucci Art Foundry in Pistoia in 1972; the final sketch was produced in 1975 Fazzini created the statue in a workshop in San Lorenzo in Piscibus, during a period when it was deconsecrated. The statue was created in honor of Pope Paul VI's 80th birthday. The pope unveiled and blessed the statue on September 28, 1977, with Fazzini in attendance. He described the statue as "monumental and unique".

The original work was done in polystyrene and the fumes of the burning plastic gave Fazzini a blood clot during its production.

In 1978, San Marino attempted to issue three stamps with pictures of the statue for Christmas. Although Fazzini approved of the stamps, Vatican City argued that it had the sole right to reproduce images of the statue and convinced San Marino to cancel them. In 2013, to commemorate Easter, the Vatican Post issued a postal stamp depicting the sculpture.

== See also ==
- Index of Vatican City-related articles
- List of statues of Jesus
