= Haskell Free Library and Opera House =

Historic site in Quebec and Vermont

Haskell Free Library and Opera House French: Bibliothèque et salle d'opéra Haskell
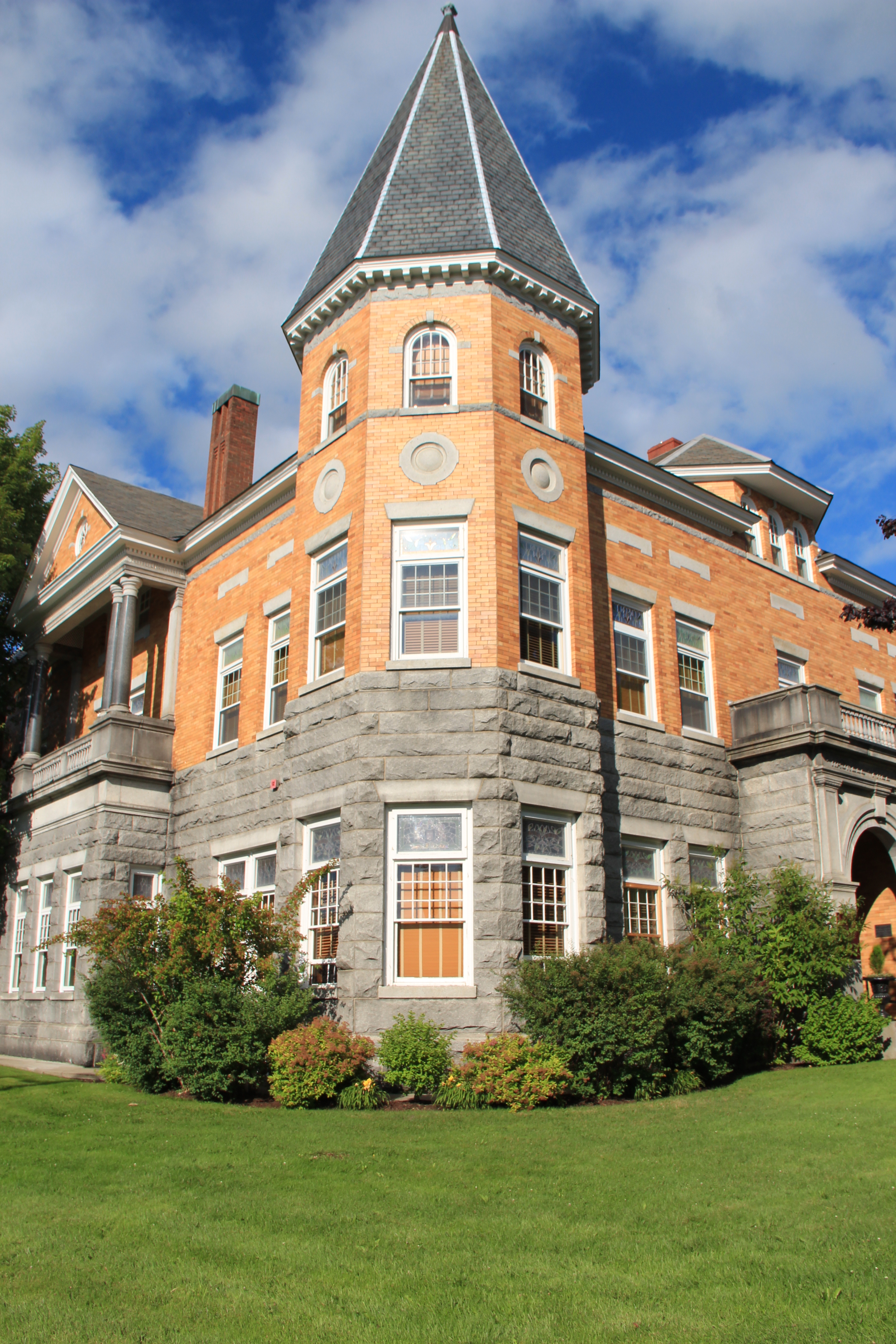
- Haskell Free Library and Opera House in 2012
- Interactive map of Haskell Free Library and Opera House; French: Bibliothèque et salle d'opéra Haskell
- 45°0′20.5″N 72°5′52″W
- Location: Stanstead, Quebec, Canada; Derby Line, Vermont, U.S.

History
- Built: 1904–1905

Site notes
- Architect(s): Nate Beach & James Ball
- Architectural styles: Romanesque Revival, Victorian, Queen Anne Revival
- Website: haskelloperahouse.org

National Historic Site of Canada
- Official name: Haskell Free Library and Opera House National Historic Site of Canada
- Designated: 15 November 1985

U.S. National Register of Historic Places
- Designated: 8 September 1976
- Reference no.: 76000143

Patrimoine culturel du Québec
- Official name: Édifice Haskell Free Library and Opera House
- Type: Classified heritage immovable
- Designated: 22 December 1977
- Reference no.: 93138

The Haskell Free Library and Opera House (French: Bibliothèque et salle d'opéra Haskell) is a Victorian building that straddles the Canada–United States border, in Rock Island (now part of Stanstead), Quebec, and Derby Line, Vermont, respectively. The Opera House opened on June 7, 1904, having deliberately been built on the international border. It was declared a heritage building by both countries in the 1970s and 1980s.

The library has two different addresses and postal codes: 93 Caswell Avenue, Derby Line, Vermont, 05830 and 1 rue Church (Church Street), Stanstead, Quebec, J0B 3E2.

== Description ==
The building was a gift of "Mrs. M. M. Haskell and her son, Col. H. S. Haskell", referring to Martha M. Haskell (née Stewart; 1831–1906) and Horace Stewart Haskell (1860–1940) of Derby Line, Vermont. It was built at a reported cost of approximately $25,000 in 1904 ($895,833 in 2025). It was designed by architect James Ball in the Queen Anne Revival style. The first floor houses the book collection and reading rooms and a 500-seat theater occupies the second and third floors.

The library collection and the theater stage are located in Stanstead, Quebec, but the main entrance and most theater seats are located in Derby Line, Vermont. Because of this, the Haskell is sometimes called "the only opera house in the U.S.A. with no stage.” A thick black line runs diagonally across the public spaces to mark the Canada–United States border.

=== Library ===
The library, located at ground level, has a collection of more than 20,000 books in English and French and is open to the public five days a week. French and English books are organized separately because of different language conventions in the direction of printing titles on spines: English books have titles written top-to-bottom, and most French books bottom-to-top.

Membership in the library is free, restricted to persons who live within "a 30 mile or 50-kilometer radius of the library", which must be confirmed through documentation, such as a utility bill, noting the person's address.

=== Opera house ===
The opera house on the second floor seats four hundred. A painted scene of Venice on the drop curtain and four other backdrops by Erwin Lamoss (1901) and plaster scrollwork complete with plump cherubs built in Boston ornament the opera hall and balcony in this historic building, which was constructed with two-foot-thick (0.61 m) walls built of granite from Stanstead. The stage and half of the seats are in Canada; the remainder of the opera hall is in the United States.

== History ==
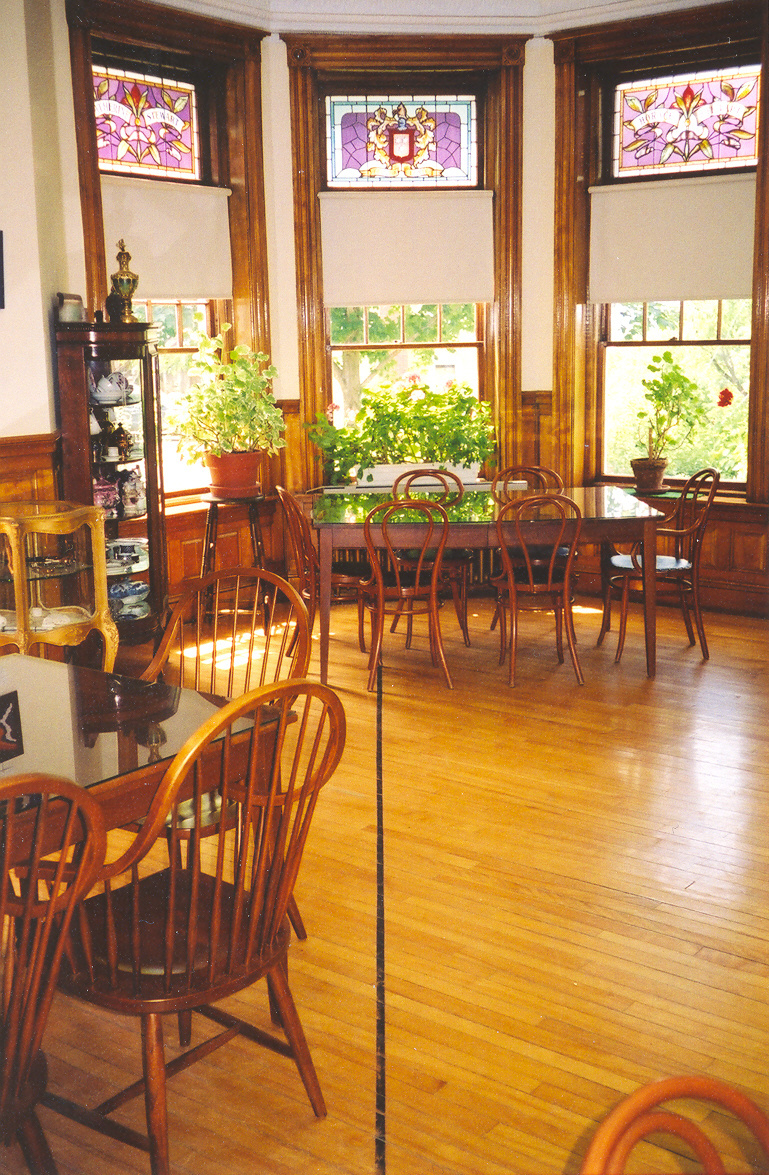
The international boundary is marked as a black-tape line on the floor of what is now used as the children’s room of the Haskell Library. In this picture, Canada is on the right side of the line and the United States is on the left.

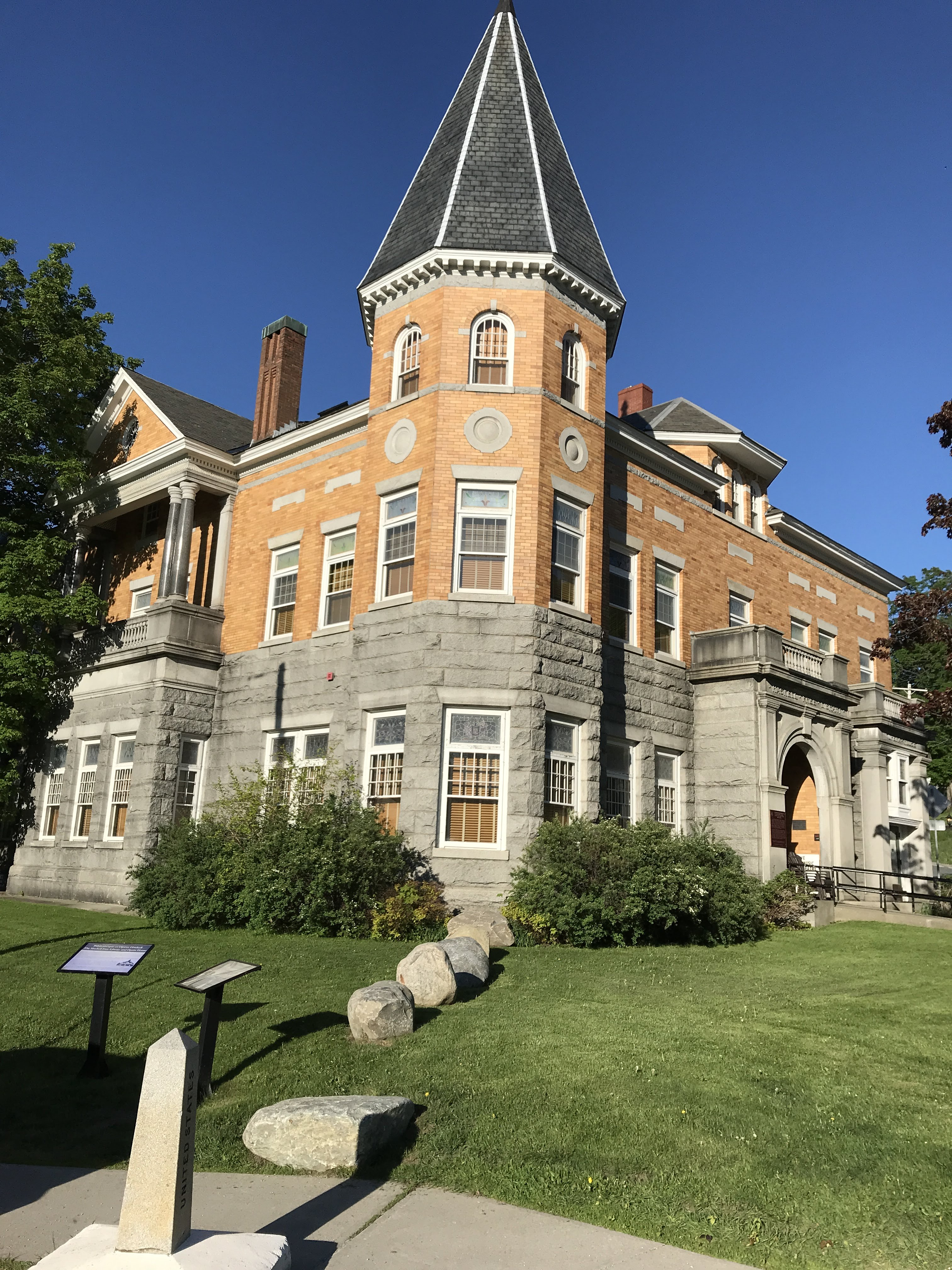
Canada is on the left side of the line and the United States is on the right. In this picture taken in 2018 the international boundary is marked outside by granite blocks and boulders.

The Haskell Free Library and Opera House was a gift from Horace Stewart Haskell and his mother, Martha Haskell (née Stewart). It was built in memory of her parents, Catherine and Horace Stewart, and her husband, Carlos Freeman Haskell. The Haskells wanted Canadians and Americans to have equal access to the Library and Opera House, so they chose to build on the (then open) border. Construction began in 1901; the Opera House opened in 1904 and the Library in 1905. The Haskell family later donated the building to the towns of Derby Line and Rock Island (now Stanstead) in Haskell's memory. It is run by a private board of four American and three Canadian directors.

The building is recognized as a historic site in both countries. In the United States, it has been registered in the National Register of Historic Places since 1976. In Canada, it has been a provincial heritage site since 1977 and was designated a National Historic Site in 1985.

=== 2010s ===
After the Trump travel ban in January 2017, the library served as a site for international reunions, as it is partly in Canada and partly in the United States. The play A Distinct Society by Kareem Fahmy is based on the family reunions that used to take place at the library. The entrances are now monitored by both government border agencies, and family reunions and cross-border visits are no longer allowed. Library staff have imposed other security measures and give U.S. and Canadian officials advance notice of large gatherings.

In January 2018, a man from Montreal pleaded guilty to charges related to the smuggling of handguns from Vermont into Quebec—in 2010 and 2011, he and accomplices illegally brought handguns, which had been purchased in the United States, into Canada via a scheme that involved hiding the handguns in the bathroom of the Haskell Free Library.

=== 2020s ===
Until 2025, patrons from Canada were permitted to use the American entrance to the library without needing to report to U.S. Customs by using a prescribed route through the sidewalk of rue Church (Church Street), provided that they returned to Canada immediately upon leaving the building using the same route. In January 2025, at the start of the second presidency of Donald Trump, a visit by then U.S. Homeland Security Secretary Kristi Noem drew sharp criticism after she stepped onto the Canadian side of the library and referred to Canada as "the 51st state", prompting a petition from residents on both sides of the border calling for an apology.

In March 2025, the United States government announced its intent to restrict Canadians from using the main entrance as of October 1, 2025, unless they first passed through U.S. Customs. In the interim, the only Canadians who could access the library via the main entrance were staff and library card holders; visitors (such as tourists) were precluded. American officials cited security concerns as a reason for the change, though there had been very few security or smuggling issues. In response, library officials announced plans to create an entrance on the Canadian side, and launched a fundraiser for a permanent, accessible entrance on the Canadian side, with author Louise Penny making a major donation. Officials initially planned to raise CA$100,000 but were able to raise CA$170,000 within a week. By early April 2025, an emergency door was opened as a temporary entrance to the public so visiting non-members could access the library from the Canadian side. The emergency door entrance involved climbing three flights of stairs, walking through the upstairs opera house, and then walking down three more flights of stairs.

In March 2026, a joint U.S. and Canadian protest occurred outside the building with protesters holding signs criticizing United States Immigration and Customs Enforcement (ICE) and the escalation of the Middle Eastern crisis.

The new, permanent entrance on the Canadian side of the library was reported as open in April 2026, with a ribbon-cutting planned for June 2026. On June 10, 2026, the new entrance was officially opened with a ceremony officiated by the mayor of Stanstead. The overall cost for the new entrance was noted to be in excess of $500,000. The president of the library's board of trustees said the project cost C$700,000, with over $350,000 raised in a crowd-funding campaign and the balance from the library's building fund.

== See also ==
- Line house, a building that straddles an international boundary.
- Baarle-Nassau and Baarle-Hertog, two communities with a complicated borderline between the Netherlands and Belgium.
- Collins–Valentine line, the boundary between Quebec and the states of Vermont and New York, surveyed in the early 1770s.
- Estcourt Station, Maine (population 4) and Pohénégamook, Quebec
- La Cure, a village divided between Switzerland and France; Hotel Arbez is bisected by the boundary, as are at least two residences and a pub.
- Paul VI Audience Hall, located partially in the Vatican City, but mostly in Rome, Italy: the Italian part of the building is treated as an extraterritorial area of the Holy See and is used by the Pope as an alternative to Saint Peter's Square when conducting his Wednesday morning General Audience.
- List of historic places in Estrie
- List of National Historic Sites of Canada in Quebec
- National Register of Historic Places listings in Orleans County, Vermont
- Transnational marriage
