= Pericle Fazzini =

Italian artist (1913–1987)

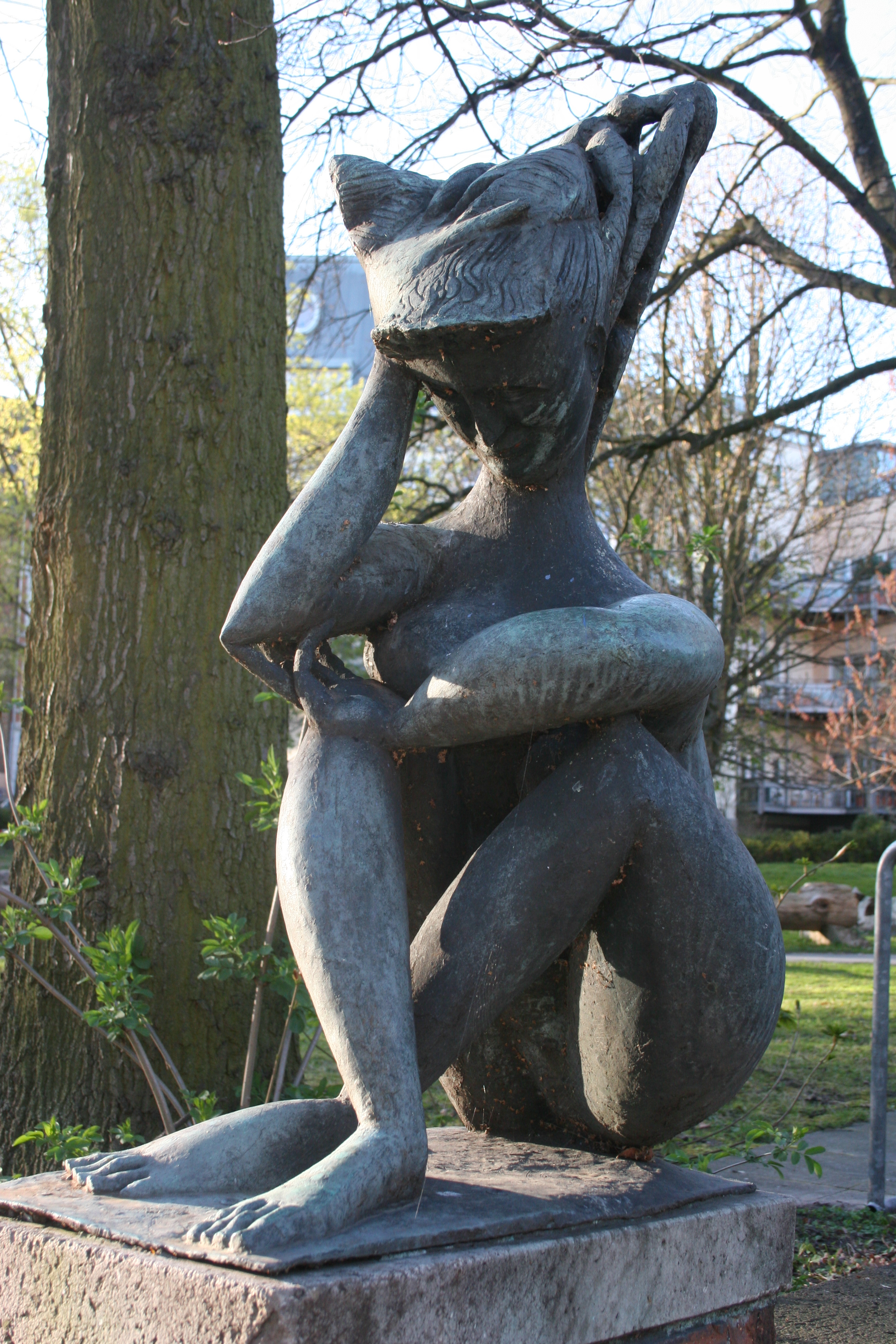
- La Sibilla (the Sibyl)
- Born: 4 May 1913; Grottammare, Marche, Italy
- Died: 4 December 1987 (age 74); Rome, Italy
- Education: Accademia di Belle Arti di Roma
- Website: periclefazzini.it

Pericle Fazzini (4 May 1913 – 4 December 1987) was an Italian painter and sculptor. His large work, La Resurrezione, is installed in the Aula Paolo VI in the Vatican City in Rome.

== Life ==
Fazzini was born on 4 May 1913 at Grottammare, in the province of Ascoli Piceno in the Marche, to Vittorio Fazzini and Maria Alessandrini. As a boy he worked with his brothers in the family carpentry workshop, where he learned to carve wood. In 1930, with the help of the poet Mario Rivosecchi, he moved to Rome to study at the Scuola libera del nudo.

In 1931 he won a competition in Catania to design a monument to cardinal Dusmet; it was never made. In 1932 he took part in a competition for the Pensionato Artistico Nazionale of the Ministero della Pubblica Istruzione, the Italian ministry of arts and education, and with his low-relief Uscita dall'arca ("leaving the ark") won a two-year bursary.

He died in Rome on 4 December 1987.

== Works ==
He started work on his large bronze La Resurrezione for the new Aula Paolo VI in the Vatican City in 1970, although he was not formally commissioned to make it until 1972. It was completed and inaugurated in 1977. A maquette is on display in the Vatican Museums.

His other works include: a Monument to Padre Pio in Piazza Padre Pio, San Giovanni Rotondo, Puglia; a Tabernacolo in the Villa Nazareth in Rome; and a Monumento alla Resistenza in Ancona, in the Marche.
