= Paul VI Audience Hall =

Building in Rome

Coordinates: 41°54′02.5″N 12°27′16.9″E

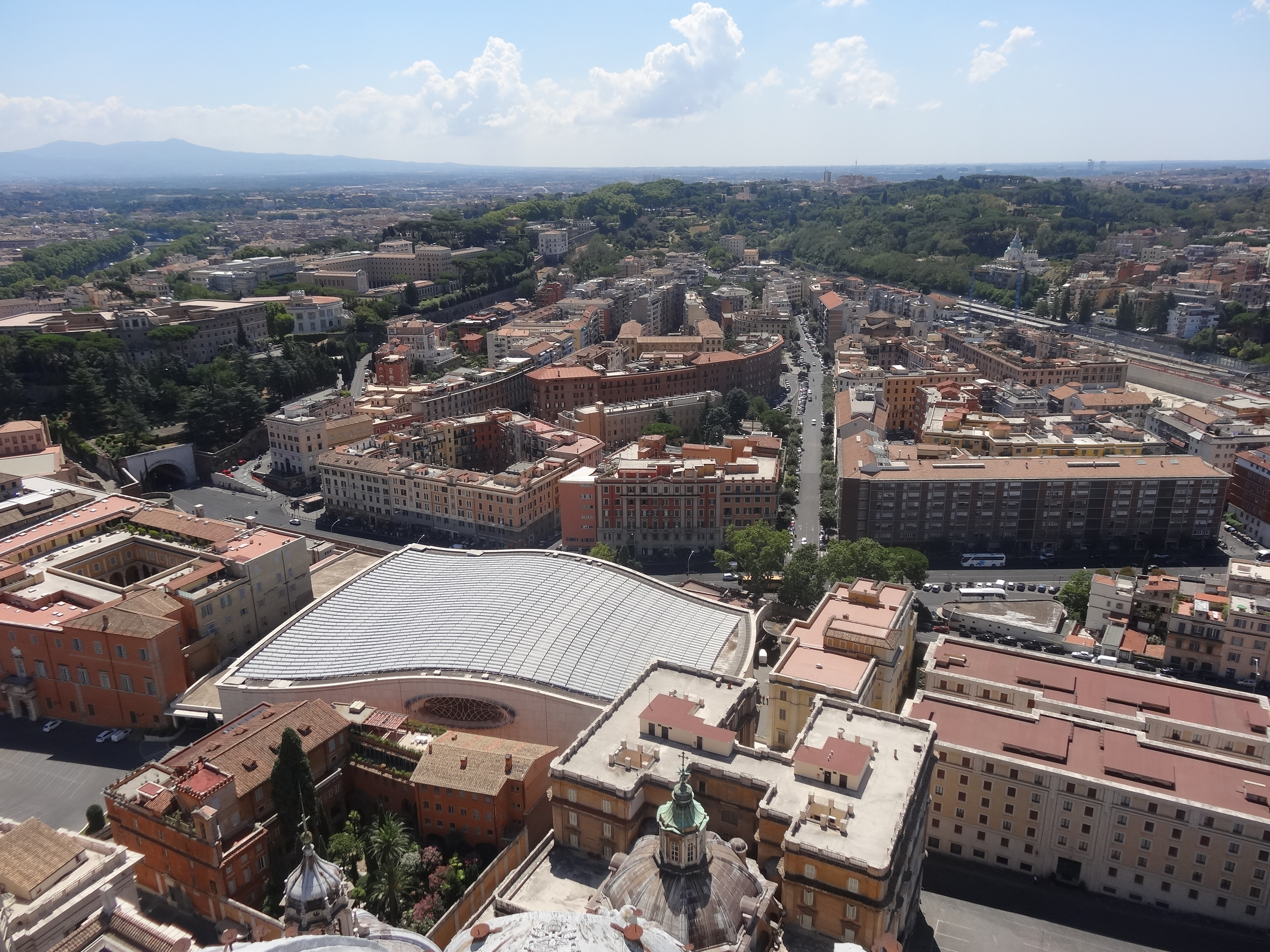
- The Paul VI Audience Hall from the roof of St. Peter's Basilica, middle lower left

- Location on a map of Vatican City
- Address: Vatican City
- Owner: Holy See

Construction
- Opened: 1971
- Architect: Pier Luigi Nervi

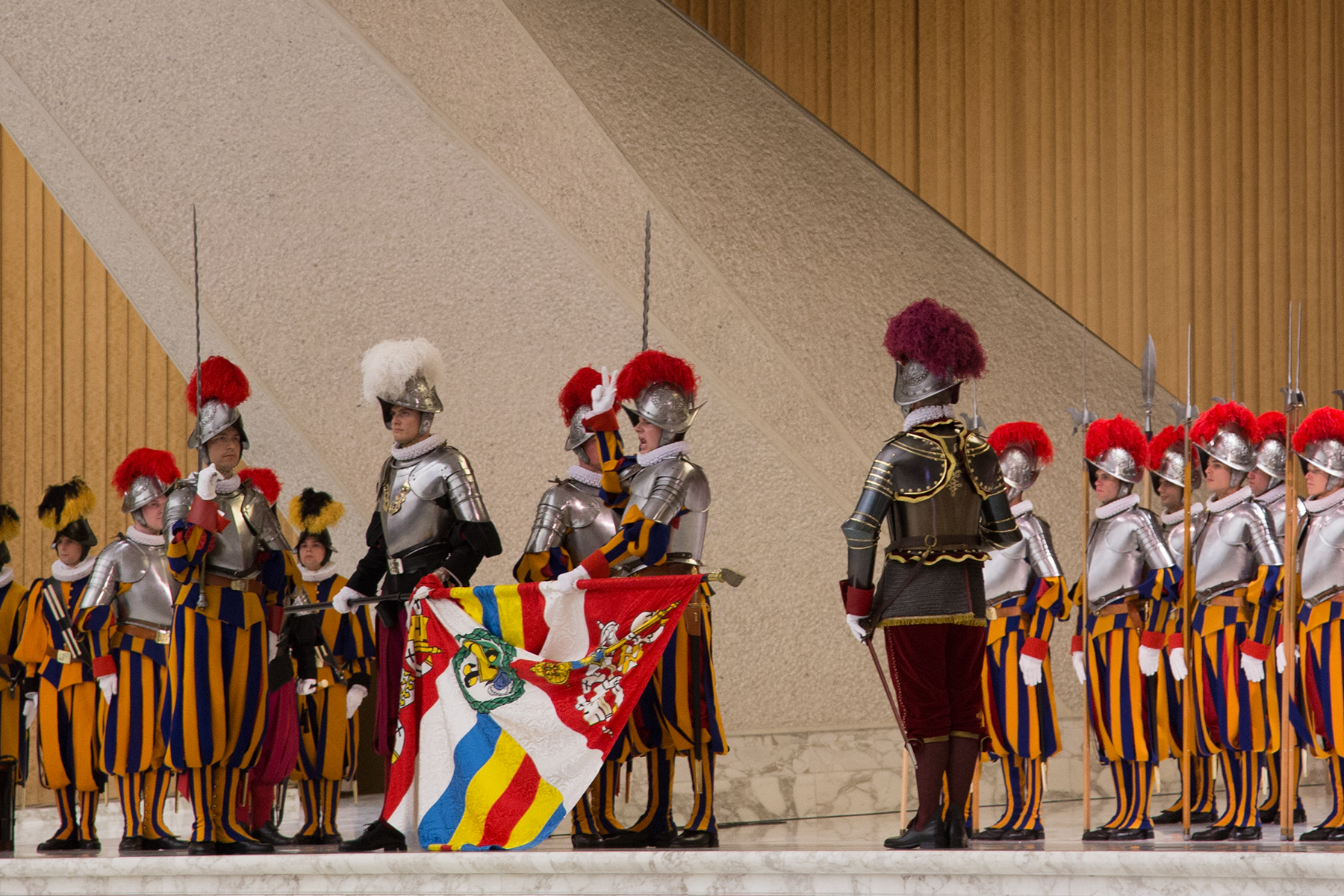
Swiss Guards sworn in at the Paul VI Audience Hall

The Paul VI Audience Hall (Italian: Aula Paolo VI), also known as the Hall of the Pontifical Audiences, is an audience hall in which the Pope has held various audiences and conferences. It is located behind the Palace of the Holy Office, east of the Domus Sanctae Marthae.

== Description ==
The hall has a seating capacity of 6,300, designed in reinforced concrete by the Italian architect Pier Luigi Nervi and completed in 1971. It was constructed on land donated by the Knights of Columbus and is named for Pope St. Paul VI. It lies partially in the Vatican City but mostly in Rome; the Italian part of the building is treated as an extraterritorial area of the Holy See, and is used by the pope as an alternative to St. Peter's Square when conducting his Wednesday morning General Audience. It is dominated by an 800-quintal (80-tonne) bronze/copper-alloysculpture by Pericle Fazzini entitled La Resurrezione (The Resurrection). The New Synod Hall (Aula Nuova del Sinodo) is located on the first floor above the vestibule of the Paul VI Audience Hall.

On 25 May 2007, it was revealed that the roof of the building was to be covered with 2,400 photovoltaic panels, generating sufficient electricity to supply all the heating, cooling, and lighting needs of the building throughout the year. The system was donated by SolarWorld, a German manufacturer, and valued at $1.5 million. It was officially placed into service on 26 November 2008, and was awarded the 2008 European Solar Prize in the category for "Solar architecture and urban development".

== See also ==
- Baarle-Nassau and Baarle-Hertog, a town of two parts consisting of multiple complex exclaves of Belgium located within the territory of the Netherlands. Numerous buildings within Baarle are bisected by an international border.
- Haskell Free Library and Opera House, a library located half in Derby Line, Vermont, United States, and half in Stanstead, Quebec, Canada.
- Hotel Arbez in the village of La Cure, divided between Switzerland and France, like the village itself, as are at least two residences and a pub.
- Line house, a building that straddles an international boundary.
