= Treaty of Dappes =

1862 treaty between France and Switzerland

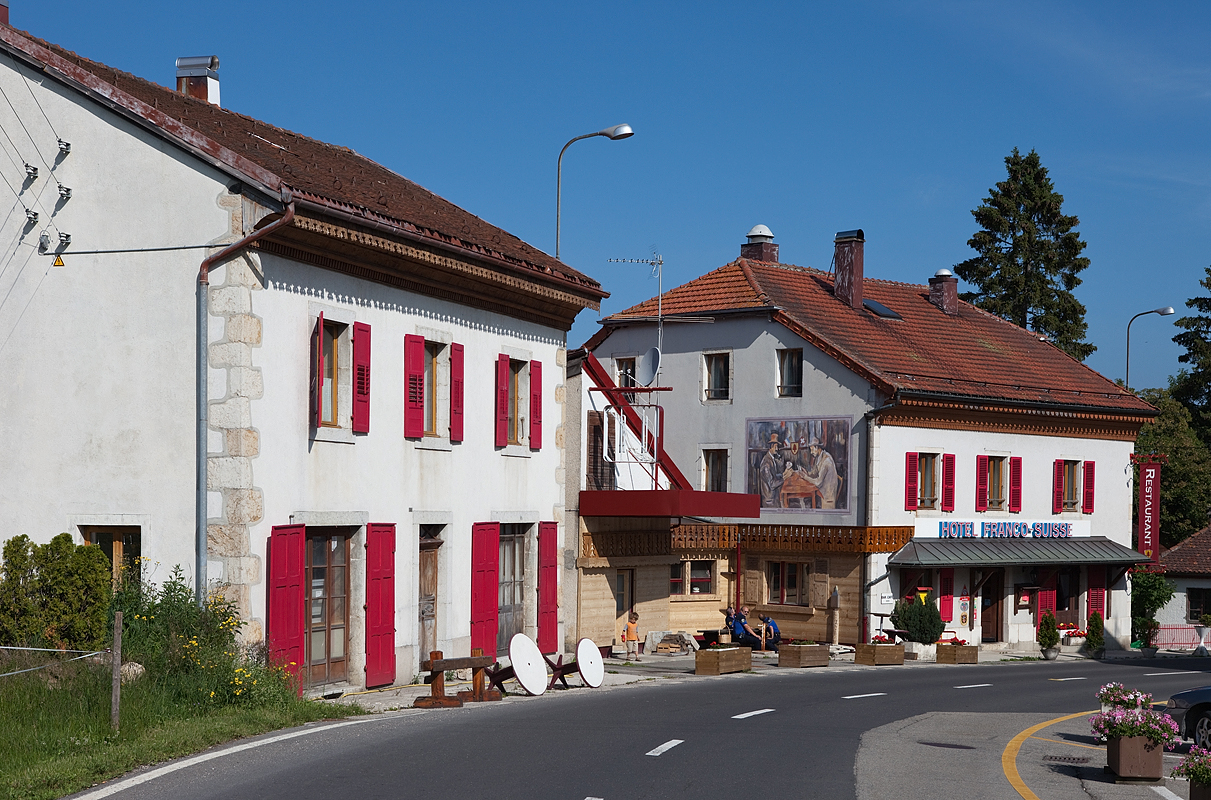
The Hotel Arbez in La Cure, bisected by the Treaty of Dappes. The border runs lengthwise through the two buildings, passing just to the left of the mural. The mural and everything to the right of it lies in Switzerland; France lies to the left.

The Treaty of Dappes was concluded on 8 December 1862 between France and the Swiss Confederation. Resolving a long-standing border dispute between the two countries, the accord awarded the Vallée des Dappes (which had been controlled by Switzerland since 1815) to France, in exchange for a comparable piece of territory just to the north. The treaty is noteworthy for dividing the tiny village of La Cure between the two countries, with the new border bisecting not just the town itself, but several structures within it.

== Background ==
The Vallée des Dappes is a small valley about 6 kilometres (4 mi) long and 3 km (2 mi) broad, located in the Swiss Canton of Vaud. Although the valley had little value as a territorial possession, it provided an accessible military route between France and Savoy. Annexed by Napoleonic France in 1802, it was returned to Switzerland by the Congress of Vienna, though the French continued to call for its retrocession. After several attempts to reacquire the area were firmly rebuffed by the Swiss, France decided in 1862 to offer a nearby section of its own territory, comparable in size, in exchange. The Swiss agreed, and a treaty to effect the switch was accordingly negotiated in Bern. Slightly less than 8 square kilometres (3 sq mi) of territory changed hands. A set of maps showing the boundary changes may be viewed here.

== La Cure ==
Formerly located entirely on the French side of the border, the small village of La Cure found itself cut in two by the new boundary. The pact stipulated that any structures already in place at the time of its implementation were to be left undisturbed, even if the border passed directly through them. Thus, at least three houses and a pub in the village were bisected by the new border, and remain divided, today.

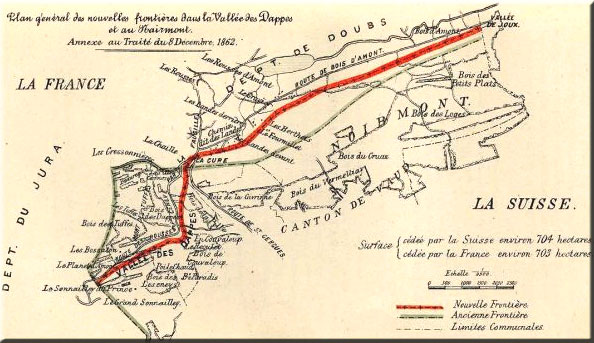
Border changes as a result of the Treaty of Dappes. The old border is marked in green, the new one in red.

Owing to the delay involved in ratification of the agreement by the Swiss Parliament, a local businessman named Ponthus decided to take advantage of the situation. He quickly erected a three-story structure right on the new boundary line, with about a third of the new building in what would become Swiss territory and the remainder in France. He operated a grocery in the Swiss portion, and a pub on the French side, hoping to capitalize on the cross-border trade. In 1921, Jules-Jean Arbeze purchased the building, and turned it into a hotel which he called the Hotel Arbez.

Today, the Franco-Swiss border established by the Treaty of Dappes passes through the kitchen, dining room, hallway and several rooms of the Hotel Arbez; in two rooms (including the honeymoon suite) the beds themselves are bisected by the boundary, while in another, the bathroom is in France, while the rest of the room is in Switzerland.

During the German occupation of France in World War II, their troops were allowed to enter the French side of the hotel, but were strictly prohibited from crossing to the Swiss side. Since the stairway to the upper floor started in French territory but ended in Switzerland, the Germans were not permitted to access any of the upper rooms, which became a refuge for refugees and French Resistance members. The hotel was chosen in 1962 for negotiation of the Évian Accords between France and Algeria, which resulted in the independence of the latter.
