= Caledonia No. 9 Grange Hall =

- U.S. National Register of Historic Places
- Location within Vermont Location within the United States
- Location: 88 East Church St., East Hardwick, Vermont
- Coordinates: 44°31′21″N 72°18′27″W
- Area: less than one acre
- Built: 1909
- Architectural style: Victorian
- NRHP reference No.: 100001937
- Added to NRHP: December 26, 2017

The Caledonia No. 9 Grange Hall is a historic building at 88 East Church Street in the East Hardwick village of Hardwick, Vermont. It was built in 1909 for what is now the oldest Grange chapter (founded 1872) in New England to operate under its original charter. The building is a well-preserved example of vernacular Queen Anne architecture, and was listed on the National Register of Historic Places in 2017.

== Description and history ==
The Caledonia No. 9 Grange Hall is located in the village of East Hardwick, on the east side of Church Street opposite its junction with Stevens Lane. It is a clapboarded wood-frame structure with a gable roof, presenting 1 1/2 stories to the street. It is set on a steep hillside above the Lamoille River, however, and has a full understory. The street-facing facade has a single-story hip-roofed porch across the front, supported by turned posts with jigsawn brackets and turned balustrades on either side of the entry stair. Scrolled brackets also adorn the building corners. A similar porch once sheltered the secondary entrance on the lower level; its surviving decorative elements have been stored.

The East Hardwick Grange chapter was founded in 1873, just one year after the first Grange chapter in New England was established in St. Johnsbury. This chapter at first met in other village spaces, including a church and the village hall, before having this building constructed in 1909. The building committee overseeing the project included former Governor of Vermont Charles J. Bell. The building is distinctive in Vermont in part because relatively few Grange halls were built specifically for that purpose, and were built following guidelines published by the national organization.

== See also ==
- National Register of Historic Places listings in Caledonia County, Vermont
