= National Register of Historic Places listings in Caledonia County, Vermont =

Location of Caledonia County in Vermont

This is a list of the National Register of Historic Places listings in Caledonia County, Vermont.

This is intended to be a complete list of the properties and districts on the National Register of Historic Places in Caledonia County, Vermont, United States. Latitude and longitude coordinates are provided for many National Register properties and districts; these locations may be seen together in a map.

There are 58 properties and districts listed on the National Register in the county, including 1 National Historic Landmark.

This National Park Service list is complete through NPS recent listings posted September 4, 2026.

Contents: Counties in Vermont
Addison - Bennington - Caledonia - Chittenden - Essex - Franklin - Grand Isle - Lamoille - Orange - Orleans - Rutland - Washington - Windham - Windsor

== Current listings ==
	Name on the Register	Image	Date listed	Location	City or town	Description
1	Barnet Center Historic District	Barnet Center Historic District	July 12, 1984 (#84003440)	Barnet Center Rd. at Ferguson Rd. 44°18′44″N 72°05′09″W	Barnet	
2	Benoit Apartment House-74 Pearl Street	Benoit Apartment House-74 Pearl Street	May 6, 1994 (#94000378)	439 Pearl St. 44°25′11″N 72°01′02″W	St. Johnsbury	
3	Benoit Apartment House-76 Pearl Street	Benoit Apartment House-76 Pearl Street	May 6, 1994 (#94000379)	447 Pearl St. 44°25′09″N 72°01′02″W	St. Johnsbury	
4	Bradley Covered Bridge	Bradley Covered Bridge	June 13, 1977 (#77000096)	North of Lyndon Center on Center St. over Miller Run; 44°32′31″N 72°00′38″W	Lyndon	
5	Building at 143 Highland Avenue	Building at 143 Highland Avenue	April 6, 2000 (#00000358)	143 Highland Ave. 44°30′22″N 72°22′07″W	Hardwick	
6	Burklyn Hall	Burklyn Hall	May 7, 1973 (#73000191)	Bemis Hill Rd. 44°35′04″N 71°57′49″W	East Burke	
7	Burrington Covered Bridge	Burrington Covered Bridge	June 13, 1974 (#74000203)	Northeast of Lyndonville off VT 114 over the East Branch of the Passumpsic River; 44°33′13″N 71°58′12″W	Lyndon	
8	Caledonia No. 9 Grange Hall		December 26, 2017 (#100001937)	88 Church St. 44°31′21″N 72°18′27″W	East Hardwick	
9	Centre Covered Bridge	Centre Covered Bridge	June 20, 1974 (#74000204)	North of Lyndonville off U.S. Route 5, over the Passumpsic River; 44°32′36″N 72°00′06″W	Lyndon	
10	Chamberlin Mill Covered Bridge	Chamberlin Mill Covered Bridge	July 30, 1974 (#74000205)	West of VT 114 over the South Wheelock Branch of Passumpsic River; 44°30′59″N 72°01′00″W	Lyndon	
11	Christian Union Society Meetinghouse	Christian Union Society Meetinghouse	May 23, 1980 (#80000385)	Bayley-Hazen Military Rd. 44°28′43″N 72°17′30″W	South Walden	
12	Cobb School	Cobb School	September 30, 1993 (#93001007)	Junction of Hardwick Town Highway 10 (Cobb School Rd.) and Sanborn Cemetery Rd. 44°33′23″N 72°20′32″W	Hardwick	
13	Cote Apartment House	Cote Apartment House	May 6, 1994 (#94000377)	16 Elm St. 44°25′18″N 72°00′40″W	St. Johnsbury	
14	Darling Estate Historic District	Darling Estate Historic District	August 23, 2011 (#10000911)	Darling Hill Rd. in Burke and Lyndon; Pinkham Rd. in Burke; 44°35′24″N 71°57′37″W	Burke and Lyndon	
15	Darling Inn	Darling Inn	November 24, 1980 (#80000386)	Depot St. 44°32′03″N 72°00′16″W	Lyndonville	
16	J. R. Darling Store	J. R. Darling Store	May 12, 2004 (#04000442)	1334 Scott Highway; 44°12′44″N 72°11′41″W	Groton	
17	District 6 School House	District 6 School House	February 1, 2006 (#05001588)	73 Cemetery Circle; 44°32′20″N 72°00′46″W	Lyndon	
18	Downtown Hardwick Village Historic District	Downtown Hardwick Village Historic District	September 30, 1982 (#82001698)	Main, Church, Maple, and Mill Sts.; also Brush St. 44°30′19″N 72°21′50″W	Hardwick	Brush St. represents a boundary increase
19	Elkins Tavern	Elkins Tavern	December 18, 1978 (#78000228)	Bayley-Hazen Rd. 44°19′22″N 72°09′58″W	Peacham	
20	Fairbanks Museum	Fairbanks Museum	January 2, 2008 (#07001344)	1302 Main St. 44°25′12″N 72°01′13″W	St. Johnsbury	
21	Franklin Fairbanks House	Franklin Fairbanks House	September 27, 1980 (#80000329)	357 Western Ave. 44°25′02″N 72°01′39″W	St. Johnsbury	
22	William and Agnes Gilkerson Farm	William and Agnes Gilkerson Farm	October 29, 1992 (#92001504)	Town Highway 5 (Kitchel Hill Rd.) west of its junction with U.S. Route 5; 44°21′44″N 72°03′41″W	Barnet	Also known as Kitchel Hill Farm.
23	Alice Lord Goodine House	Alice Lord Goodine House	May 12, 2004 (#04000441)	1304 Scott Highway; 44°12′37″N 72°11′40″W	Groton	Houses the local library.
24	Greenbanks Hollow Covered Bridge	Greenbanks Hollow Covered Bridge	June 13, 1974 (#74000206)	South of Danville, Greenbanks Hollow Rd. over Joes Brook; 44°22′38″N 72°07′20″W	Danville	
25	Grouselands		December 22, 1983 (#83004224)	Town Highway 26; 44°29′38″N 72°07′14″W	Danville	
26	Hardwick Street Historic District	Hardwick Street Historic District	June 22, 1979 (#79000321)	Northeast of Hardwick; 44°33′00″N 72°17′58″W	Hardwick	
27	Hudson House		July 20, 2026 (#100013238)	380 Portland Street; 44°25′14″N 72°00′30″W	St. Johnsbury	
28	Lee Farm	Lee Farm	May 26, 1983 (#83003205)	VT 18; 44°25′20″N 71°57′03″W	Waterford	
29	Lind Houses	Lind Houses	September 27, 1988 (#88001589)	Pleasant St. 44°11′07″N 72°08′19″W	South Ryegate	
30	Lower Waterford Congregational Church	Lower Waterford Congregational Church	July 8, 2019 (#100004181)	63 Lower Waterford Rd. 44°21′17″N 71°54′27″W	Waterford	
31	Maple Street-Clarks Avenue Historic District	Maple Street-Clarks Avenue Historic District	May 5, 1994 (#94000381)	17-49 Maple St., 4-34 Clarks Ave., 95½-101 Main St., 4 and 6 Frost Ave., and 3 and 5 Idlewood Terr. 44°25′18″N 72°01′04″W	St. Johnsbury	
32	Caleb H. Marshall House	Caleb H. Marshall House	August 16, 1994 (#94000868)	426 Summer St. 44°25′17″N 72°01′18″W	St. Johnsbury	
33	Mathewson Block	Mathewson Block	May 20, 1999 (#99000623)	Junction of Main St. and Maple St. 44°32′07″N 72°00′21″W	Lyndon	
34	McIndoes Academy	McIndoes Academy	May 6, 1975 (#75000137)	Main St. 44°15′51″N 72°03′52″W	McIndoe Falls	
35	Methodist-Episcopal Church	Methodist-Episcopal Church	January 5, 1978 (#78000229)	Off VT 16; 44°32′33″N 72°12′48″W	Stannard	
36	Morency Paint Shop and Apartment Building	Morency Paint Shop and Apartment Building	May 5, 1994 (#94000380)	73-77 Portland St. 44°25′13″N 72°00′30″W	St. Johnsbury	
37	New Discovery State Park	New Discovery State Park	January 17, 2002 (#01001475)	4239 VT 232; 44°18′36″N 72°15′08″W	Peacham	
38	Old Schoolhouse Bridge	Old Schoolhouse Bridge	March 31, 1971 (#71000055)	S. Wheelock Rd. over Cold Hill Brook; 44°30′57″N 72°00′38″W	Lyndon	
39	Peacham Corner Historic District	Peacham Corner Historic District	December 18, 2003 (#03001308)	Bayley Hazen Rd., Main St., Church St., Academy Hill, Old Cemetery Rd., Macks Mountain Rd. 44°19′39″N 72°10′21″W	Peacham	
40	Railroad Street Historic District	Railroad Street Historic District	June 25, 1974 (#74000354)	Roughly bounded north and south by Railroad St. and the Canadian Pacific railroad tracks 44°25′01″N 72°01′00″W	St. Johnsbury	
41	Ricker Pond State Park	Ricker Pond State Park	March 29, 2002 (#02000277)	526 State Forest Rd. 44°14′41″N 72°14′54″W	Groton	
42	Riverside	Riverside	June 17, 1993 (#93000532)	Lily Pond Rd. south of Lyndonville; 44°30′47″N 71°59′40″W	Lyndonville	
43	Shearer and Corser Double House	Shearer and Corser Double House	August 16, 1994 (#94000861)	592 Summer St. 44°25′26″N 72°01′12″W	St. Johnsbury	
44	Josiah and Lydia Shedd Farmstead	Josiah and Lydia Shedd Farmstead	March 17, 2005 (#05000188)	1721 Bayley-Hazen Rd. 44°20′37″N 72°10′36″W	Peacham	
45	St. Johnsbury Athenaeum	St. Johnsbury Athenaeum	June 18, 1996 (#96000970)	30 Main St. 44°25′04″N 72°01′19″W	St. Johnsbury	Significant due to its construction, its American paintings and books from its original role as a public library and free art gallery, and its funding by Horace Fairbanks, manufacturer of the world’s first platform scale.
46	St. Johnsbury Federal Fish Culture Station	St. Johnsbury Federal Fish Culture Station	March 18, 2005 (#05000189)	374 Emerson Falls Rd. 44°25′59″N 72°02′15″W	St. Johnsbury	Now houses offices.
47	St. Johnsbury Historic District	St. Johnsbury Historic District	April 17, 1980 (#80000424)	U.S. Routes 2 and 5; 44°25′06″N 72°01′02″W	St. Johnsbury	
48	St. Johnsbury Main Street Historic District	St. Johnsbury Main Street Historic District	May 28, 1975 (#75000238)	Area along Main St. including intersecting streets 44°25′06″N 72°01′14″W	St. Johnsbury	
49	Stannard Schoolhouse	Stannard Schoolhouse	December 12, 1977 (#77000097)	Off VT 16; 44°32′34″N 72°12′52″W	Stannard	Now the town hall.
50	Stillwater State Park	Stillwater State Park	March 29, 2002 (#02000278)	126 Boulder Beach Rd. 44°16′46″N 72°16′23″W	Groton	
51	Thresher Mill	Thresher Mill	April 4, 1996 (#96000386)	W. Barnet Rd., approximately 1.5 mi (2.4 km) west of Barnet; 44°18′37″N 72°05′51″W	Barnet	
52	Phineas Thurston House	Phineas Thurston House	October 30, 1989 (#89001788)	Barnet Town Highway 12; 44°21′56″N 72°01′29″W	Barnet	
53	Toll House	Toll House	August 9, 2006 (#06000704)	2028 Mountain Rd. 44°35′38″N 71°54′12″W	Burke	
54	Union Meeting House	Union Meeting House	January 4, 2008 (#07001345)	2614 Burke Hollow Rd. 44°37′20″N 71°56′55″W	Burke	
55	West View Farm	West View Farm	January 6, 1995 (#94001522)	Along Waterford Highway 34; 44°24′08″N 71°59′33″W	Waterford	
56	Wheelock Common Historic District	Wheelock Common Historic District	August 30, 2007 (#07000894)	VT 122 and Town Highway 17; 44°35′16″N 72°04′59″W	Wheelock	
57	Whitehill House	Whitehill House	May 30, 1975 (#75000138)	North of Ryegate on Groton-Peacham Rd. 44°15′55″N 72°10′27″W	Ryegate	
58	Whittier House	Whittier House	August 23, 1984 (#84003456)	Greenbanks Hollow Rd. 44°22′43″N 72°07′22″W	Danville	

== See also ==
- List of National Historic Landmarks in Vermont
- National Register of Historic Places listings in Vermont
