= Thresher Mill =

- U.S. National Register of Historic Places
- U.S. Historic district
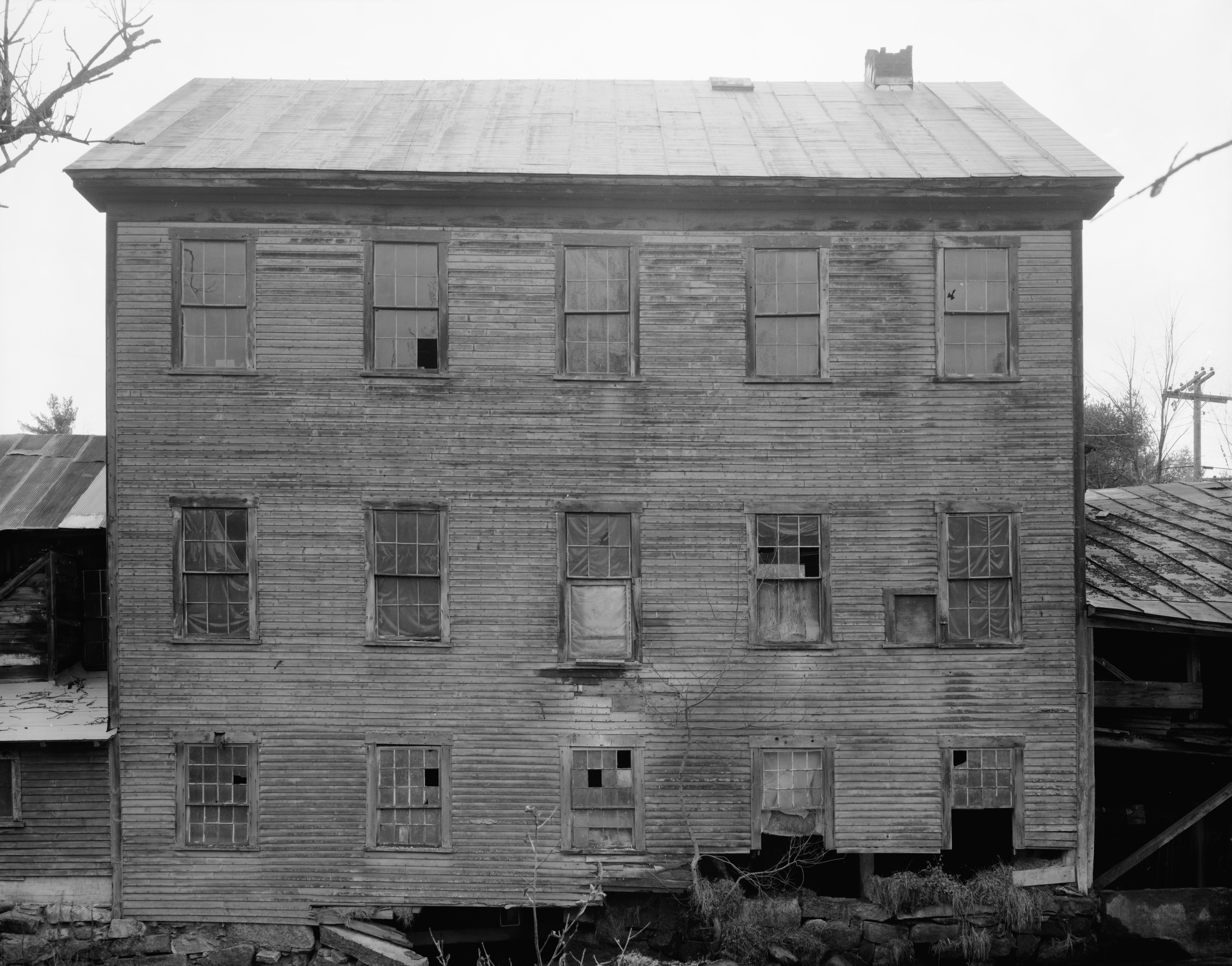
- HAER photo, 1979

- Location within Vermont Location within the United States
- Location: West Barnet Road, approximately 1.5 miles (2.4 km) west of the village of Barnet, Vermont
- Coordinates: 44°18′37″N 72°5′51″W
- Area: 4.1 acres (1.7 ha)
- Built: 1836
- Built by: Bartholomew Carrick, Alexander Jack
- Architectural style: propped plank and timber dam
- NRHP reference No.: 96000386
- Added to NRHP: April 4, 1996

The Thresher Mill is a historic industrial facility on West Barnet Road in Barnet, Vermont. First developed in 1836, it was the last water-powered mill to operate on the Stevens River, lasting into the late 20th century. The property, which includes an original mill dam and a surviving 1872 mill building, as well as archaeological sites of other industrial buildings, was listed on the National Register of Historic Places in 1996. It is now styled Ben's Mill, and is a local museum.

== Description and history ==
The Thresher Mill is located in a rural setting a short way west of Barnet Center, between the Stevens River to the north and West Barnet Road to the south. The only visible elements of the complex are the main mill building and the breached crib dam spanning the river. The mill building consists of a 2 1/2-story wood frame main block, with added single-story elements on either side. It is covered by a metal roof and finished in wooden clapboards. The dam extends northward from the building across the river; it is built mainly out of planking and logs. North and south of the mill are the remnant sites of several barns and a tannery.

The industrial history of the site begins in 1836, when the land and water rights were purchased by Benjamin Carrick, who built a log cabin on the site. Carrick also built a stone dam (portions of which still survive above the wooden dam), and began operating a sawmill and tannery. The site was abandoned sometime after 1850, and was restarted in the early 1870s by Alexander Jack, who built the core of the current dam and the surviving mill building. Jack operated a variety of industrial businesses, including dying, machining, and blacksmithing on the site. A water turbine was installed on the site in the early 20th century, and was an early provider of electrical power to the village of Barnet.

The property was owned by Ben Thresher from 1947 until his death in 1994, and at that time included operational water-powered machine equipment and infrastructure. In 1982 Ben's Mill, a documentary film, was released and nominated for an Academy Award.

== See also ==
- National Register of Historic Places listings in Caledonia County, Vermont
