= Whittier House =

Whittier House may refer to one of the following:

- John Greenleaf Whittier House in Amesbury, Massachusetts
- John Greenleaf Whittier Homestead in Haverhill, Massachusetts
- Skolfield-Whittier House in Brunswick, Maine
- Whittier House (Danville, Vermont)
- Whittier House (Jersey City, New Jersey)

== See also ==
- Category:Buildings and structures in Whittier, California
- Whittier (disambiguation)
