= Whittier =

Whittier may refer to:

== Places ==
- Whittier, Alaska
  - Whittier Airport
- Whittier, California, named for John Greenleaf Whittier
  - Whittier College, a private liberal arts college
    - Whittier Law School
  - Whittier High School
  - Whittier Hills, a local name for the western end of the Puente Hills
  - Whittier Narrows, a water gap between the Puente Hills and the Montebello Hills
- Whittier, Denver, a neighborhood in Denver, Colorado
- Whittier, Iowa
- Whittier, Minneapolis, a neighborhood in Minneapolis, Minnesota
- Whittier, North Carolina

== People with the surname ==
- Charles A. Whittier (1840–1908), American Civil War Union brevet brigadier general
- Edward N. Whittier (1840–1902), American soldier
- Helen Augusta Whittier (1846–1925), American editor, lecturer, teacher, clubwoman, businesswoman
- John Greenleaf Whittier (1807–1892), American poet and abolitionist
- Max Whittier (1867–1928), American real estate developer
- Nancy Whittier (born 1966), sociologist
- Pauline Whittier (1876–1946), American golfer
- Sumner G. Whittier (1911–2010), American politician from Massachusetts

== Fictional characters ==
- Whittier Smith, main protagonist of the film Bring It On Again, played by Anne Judson-Yager
- Pollyanna Whittier, title character of Eleanor H. Porter's novel Pollyanna (1913)

== Other uses ==
- The Whittier, a high rise residential complex and former hotel in Detroit, Michigan
- Whittier Line, a former Pacific Electric train route in California
- Whittier Fire, a 2017 wildfire in Santa Barbara County, California
- Whittier Boulevard, a street in Los Angeles, California
- Whittier (horse), an Australian Thoroughbred race horse

== See also ==
- Mount Whittier (disambiguation)
- Whittier House (disambiguation)
