= Shearer and Corser Double House =

Historic house in Vermont, United States

- U.S. National Register of Historic Places
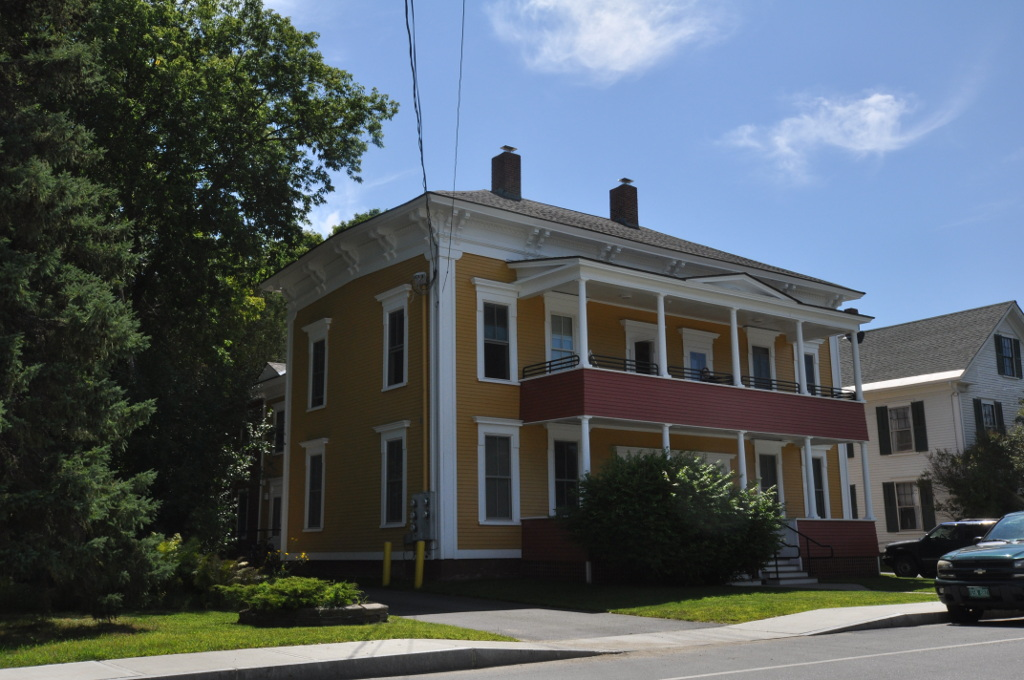

- Location within Vermont Location within the United States
- Location: 592 Summer St., St. Johnsbury, Vermont
- Coordinates: 44°25′26″N 72°1′12″W
- Area: less than one acre
- Built: 1880
- Architectural style: Italianate, Colonial Revival
- MPS: St. Johnsbury MPS
- NRHP reference No.: 94000861
- Added to NRHP: August 16, 1994

The Shearer and Corser Double House is a historic house at 592 Summer Street in St. Johnsbury, Vermont. Built as a school about 1854, it has had a history of varied uses and prominent local owners, and has high quality Colonial Revival and Italianate features. It was listed on the National Register of Historic Places in 1994.

== Description and history ==
The Shearer and Corser Double House stands in a suburban residential area northwest of downtown St. Johnsbury, on the east side of Summer Street between Webster and Mt. Pleasant Streets. It is a two-story wood-frame structure, with a hip roof and clapboarded exterior. Corner pilasters rise to an entablature and cornice bracketed in the Italianate style. The main facade is six bays wide, with a two-story Colonial Revival porch extending across the center four bays. Its hip roof is supported by Tuscan columns, and it has shingled skirts topped by low metal balustrades. Its two entrances are in the two center bays, each doorway flanked by sidelight windows; they share a molded lintel. Windows are topped by slightly projecting moulded cornices. The interior is divided into roughly symmetrical side-by-side units, each retaining some original 19th-century woodwork.

This building began life as a schoolhouse, built in the mid-1850s, and located at the corner of Summer and Winter Streets. In 1864 it was moved to its present location and was converted into an armory. In 1870 the town sold the building to Franklin Fairbanks, co-owner of the Fairbanks Scale Works, the town's largest employer. The Fairbanks family originally laid out Summer Street and oversaw its residential development. It is unclear whether they were responsible for the building's Italianate features, or if they were added by Leroy Shearer and Brackett Corser, who purchased it from Fairbanks in 1878. The pair are probably responsible for its conversion into a two-family residence, which is how it was recorded at a tax sale in 1883. The house subsequently has had a variety of owners; the front porch was probably added in the 1910s.

== See also ==
- National Register of Historic Places listings in Caledonia County, Vermont
