= Christian Union Society Meetinghouse =

Historic church in Vermont, United States

- U.S. National Register of Historic Places
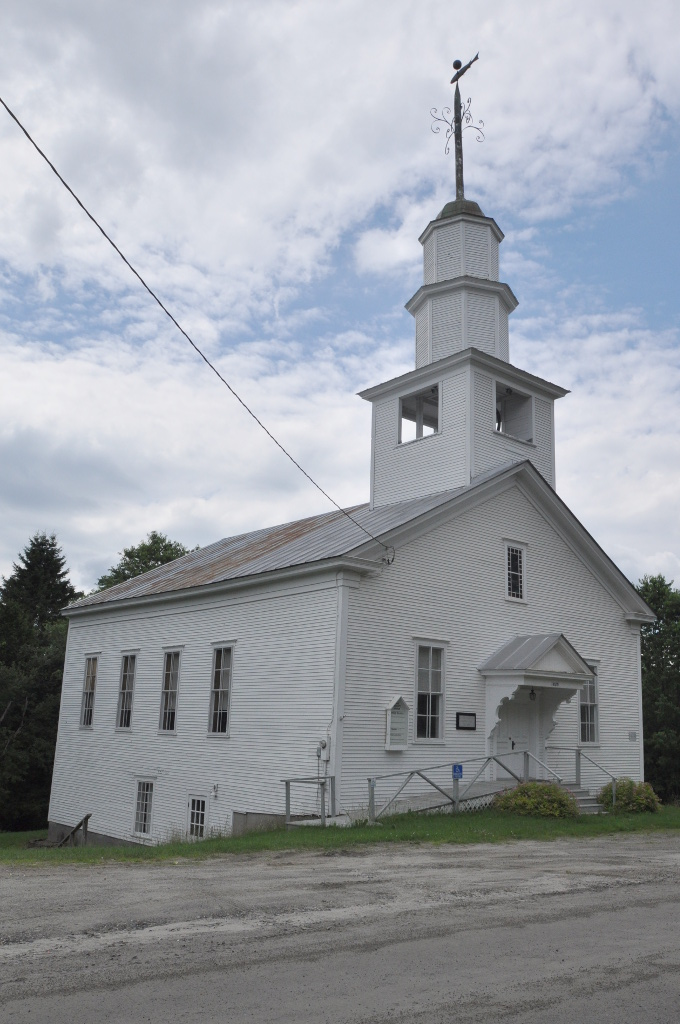

- Location within Vermont Location within the United States
- Location: Bayley-Hazen Military Rd., South Walden, Vermont
- Coordinates: 44°28′43″N 72°17′30″W
- Area: 0.5 acres (0.20 ha)
- Built: 1825
- Architectural style: Federal
- NRHP reference No.: 80000385
- Added to NRHP: May 23, 1980

The Christian Union Society Meetinghouse, more recently known as the South Walden United Methodist Church, is a historic church on Bayley-Hazen Military Road in South Walden, Vermont. Built in 1825, it is a prominent local example of Federal style architecture. It is also notable for its association with a 19th-century religious movement in the region known as the "Age of Benevolence". The building was listed on the National Register of Historic Places in 1980.

== Description and history ==
The former Christian Union Society Meetinghouse stands in a rural area, north of the crossroads village of South Walden, on the west side of the Bayley Hazen Military Road. It is a two-story wood-frame structure, with a gabled roof, clapboarded exterior, and a foundation of stone and concrete. It is set on a steeply sloping lot, so from the front it appears as a single story, with the lower level almost fully exposed on three sides. A three-stage tower rises from the roof ridge, beginning with a square section with an open belfry. This is topped by two octagonal stages, each decreasing in size, and is topped by a bellcast cupola. The front facade is three bays wide, with sash windows flanking the entry, which is sheltered by a gabled hood supported by Italianate brackets. The interior is mainly the result of a late 19th-century renovation.

The church was built in 1825 as a union church, serving four different Christian religious denominations. It was built on land belonging to Leonard Farrington, an early settler of the area. Vermont's Northeast Kingdom was at this time undergoing an intense religious revival known as the Age of Benevolence, in which a large number of churches were built throughout the region. The design of this building is based on that of a (now demolished) church in nearby Danville. The membership of three of the participating congregations declined in the 19th century, and the building eventually came under the full control of the Methodists. It underwent major renovations in 1897, and again in 1975–76, although the latter were primarily to modernize the basement space.

== See also ==
- National Register of Historic Places listings in Caledonia County, Vermont
