= Franklin Fairbanks House =

Historic house in Vermont, United States

- U.S. National Register of Historic Places
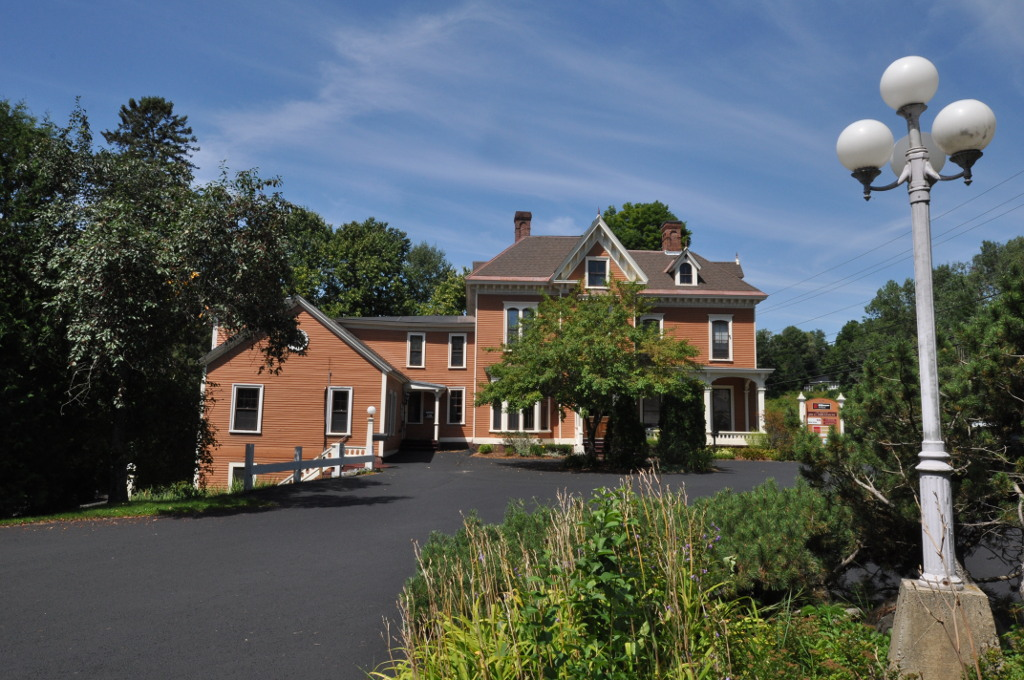

- Location within Vermont Location within the United States
- Location: 357 Western Ave., St. Johnsbury, Vermont
- Coordinates: 44°25′2″N 72°1′39″W
- Area: 1.5 acres (0.61 ha)
- Built: 1860
- Architectural style: Italian Villa
- NRHP reference No.: 80000329
- Added to NRHP: September 27, 1980

The Franklin Fairbanks House is a historic house at 357 Western Avenue in St. Johnsbury, Vermont. It was built in 1860 for Franklin Fairbanks, a prominent local businessman and philanthropist. The house is an excellent example of Italianate architecture, and was listed on the National Register of Historic Places in 1980. It now houses professional offices.

== Description and history ==
The Franklin Fairbanks House stands west of downtown St. Johnsbury, on the south side of Western Avenue (United States Route 2), between the Fairbanks Inn and the St. Johnsbury School. It is a 2 1/2-story wood-frame structure, with a hip roof, clapboarded exterior, and brick foundation. It has a basic T-shaped layout, with gabled projections to both sides, with its main facade oriented facing east. It has high-style Italianate decorative features, including roof dormers with finials, a bracketed cornice, polygonal window bays, and a porch with chamfered posts. A carriage barn is attached at the southern end.

The house was built in 1860 for Franklin Fairbanks, then a principal in the E. & T. Fairbanks Scale Company, whose factory complex was located roughly between the house and the Passumpsic River. The house is a close implementation of Plate 21 of Villas and Cottages, a design pattern book published by Calvert Vaux. Fairbanks is remembered locally for his philanthropy, which notably includes the founding of the Fairbanks Museum. The factory complex was destroyed by fire in 1972; Fairbanks' house, which he occupied until 1872, has been converted for use as professional offices.

== See also ==
- National Register of Historic Places listings in Caledonia County, Vermont
