= Cote Apartment House =

- U.S. National Register of Historic Places
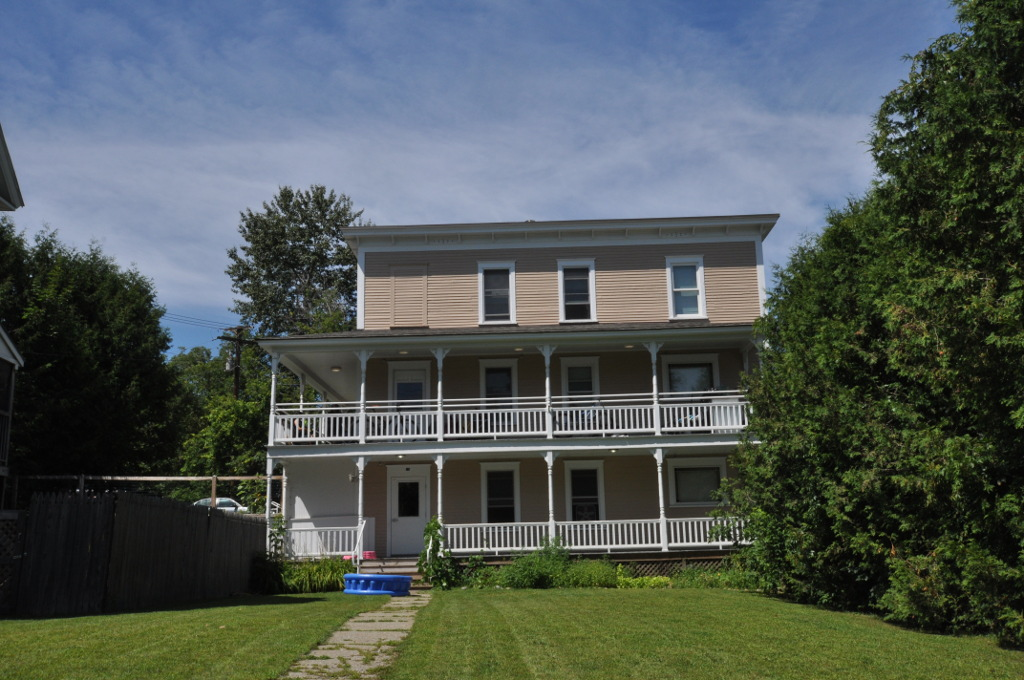

- Location within Vermont Location within the United States
- Location: 16 Elm St., St. Johnsbury, Vermont
- Coordinates: 44°25′18″N 72°0′40″W
- Area: less than one acre
- Built: 1914
- Architectural style: Italianate, Queen Anne
- MPS: St. Johnsbury MPS
- NRHP reference No.: 94000377
- Added to NRHP: May 6, 1994

The Cote Apartment House is a historic multi-unit residential building at 16 Elm Street in St. Johnsbury, Vermont. Built in 1914, it is a distinctive late example of Victorian architecture, set as part of a group of buildings typical of residential developments by the town's French Canadian immigrants. The building was listed on the National Register of Historic Places in 1994.

== Description and history ==
The Cote Apartment House is located on St. Johnsbury's east side, in a small enclave of densely built residential buildings on the west side of Elm Street north of United States Route 2. It is the northernmost of a cluster of multiunit residences organized around a common courtyard, accessed by a lane now called Cote Court, but is visible from Elm Street across a patch of lawn. It is a three-story wood-frame structure, with a flat roof and clapboarded exterior. Its principal visual features are two-story porches, which extend along the front and most of the western side (which faces toward the courtyard. The porches have turned posts with brackets at the top, and square balusters. The main roof has an extended eave adorned with simple scroll-sawn brackets. The building houses three units, each of which retains original woodwork and other features.

The Elm Street area was already developed by 1875, but became progressively more densely built in the early 20th century, as single-family houses and their outbuildings were either converted into tenements or demolished to make way for them. This house was built in 1912 by Marcelle and Marie Cote, as one of three buildings constructed by members of the extended Cote family, who were French Canadian immigrants. The courtyard arrangement of these buildings was not an unusual arrangement for these immigrants, providing living space for large extended families, and is found elsewhere in the town. It was sold by the Cotes to the Giroux family in 1921. In 1985 it was acquired by a local housing group, which undertook its rehabilitation.

== See also ==
- National Register of Historic Places listings in Caledonia County, Vermont
