= Ben's Mill =

1982 film

- Directed by: Michel Chalufour; John Karol
- Country of origin: United States
- Original language: English

Production
- Producers: Michael Ambrosino; Michel Chalufour; John Karol
- Running time: 59 minutes
- Production company: Public Broadcasting Associates

Original release
- Release: 1982

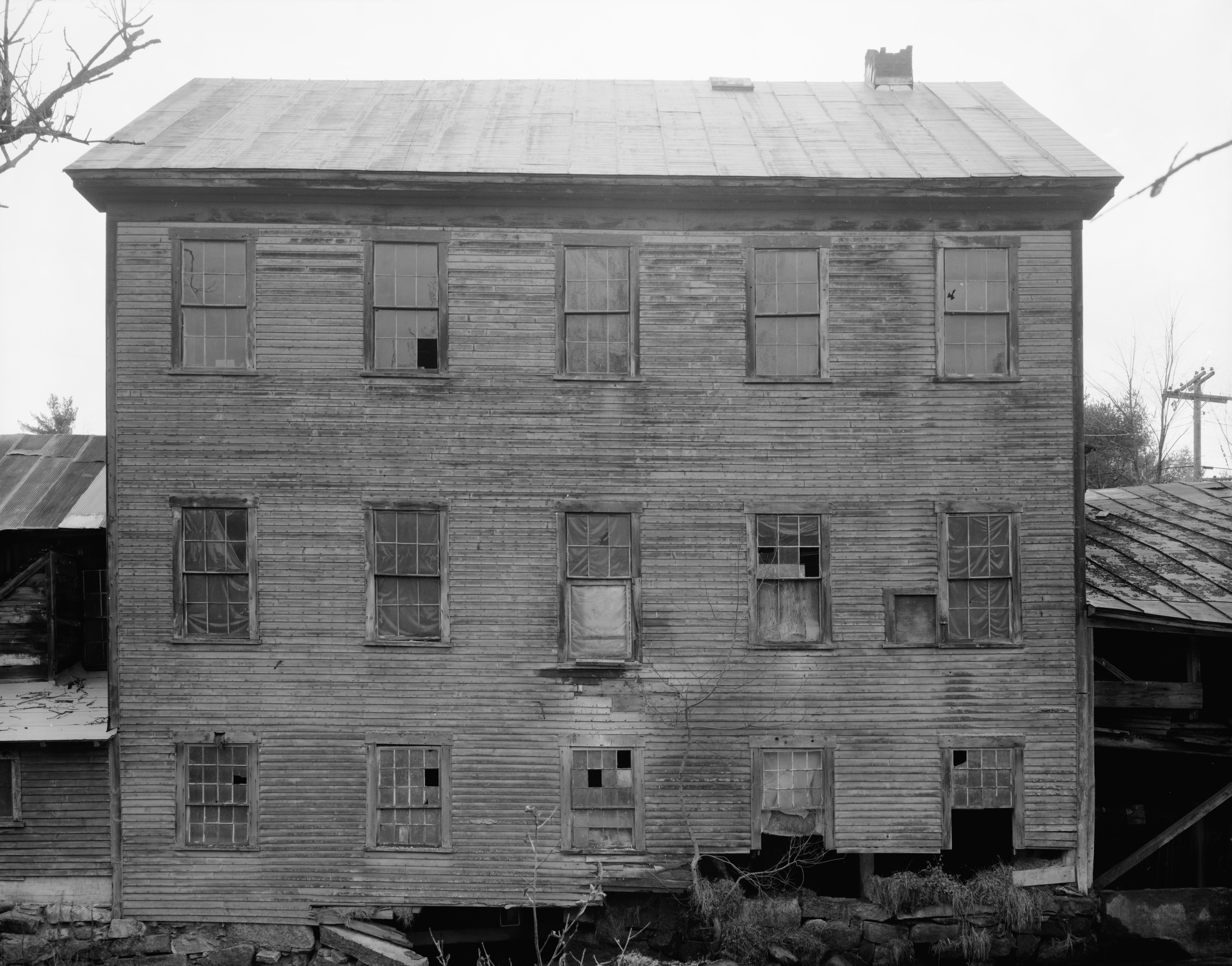
Rear of the Ben Thresher Mill, located along Vermont Route 1 approximately 1.5 miles west of Barnet Center, Vermont, United States. Built in 1836, it is listed on the National Register of Historic Places

Ben's Mill is a 1982 American documentary film directed by Michel Chalufour and John Karol.

== Summary ==
The film, set in Barnet, Vermont, details the workings of the Thresher Mill on the Stevens River, including how energy from the river is used to drive a multitude of leather belts and various machines. The film focuses on the steps one man, Ben, uses to make one of his white pine watering tanks, and then a horse-drawn sled for different members of the Barnet community. The film was produced as an episode of the PBS series Odyssey.

== Reception ==
Writing in American Anthropologist, George L. Hicks stated that "Ben's Mill exercises tight control on its nostalgia, while using specific detail to demonstrate its point."

== Accolades ==
It was nominated for an Academy Award for Best Documentary Feature.
