= Morency Paint Shop and Apartment Building =

Historic building in Vermont, United States

- U.S. National Register of Historic Places
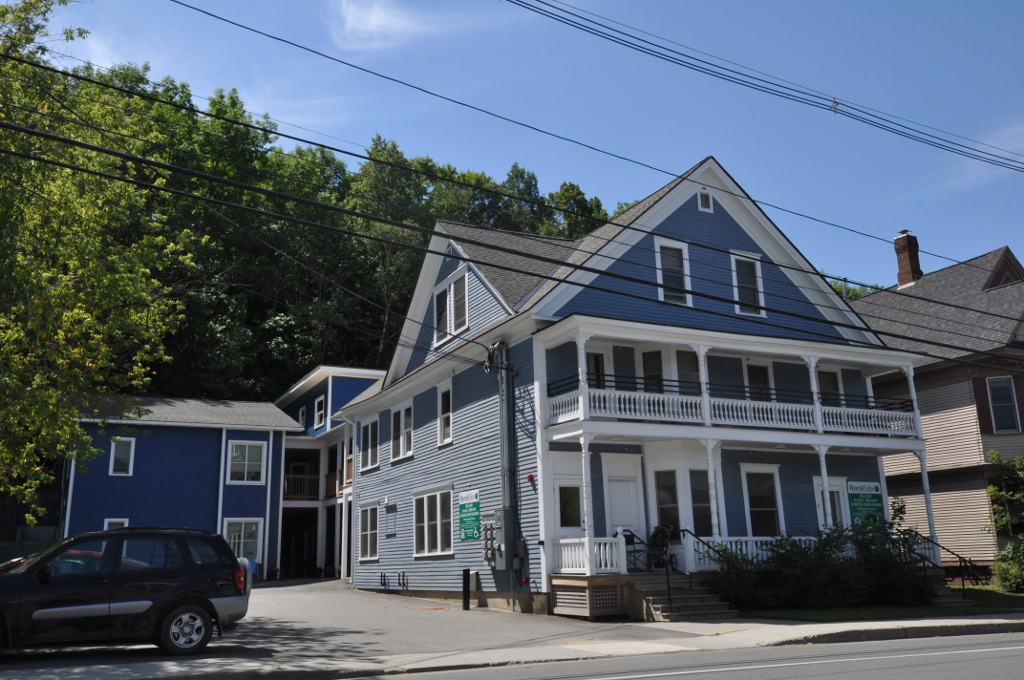

- Location within Vermont Location within the United States
- Location: 73-77 Portland St., St. Johnsbury, Vermont
- Coordinates: 44°25′13″N 72°0′30″W
- Area: less than one acre
- Built: 1890
- Architectural style: Queen Anne, Colonial Revival
- MPS: St. Johnsbury MPS
- NRHP reference No.: 94000380
- Added to NRHP: May 5, 1994

The Morency Paint Shop and Apartment Building is a historic mixed-use building at 77-79 Portland Street on the east side of St. Johnsbury, Vermont. Built in 1890 by a carriage painter, it is a good example of Victorian vernacular mixed commercial and residential architecture. Now completely in residential use, it was listed on the National Register of Historic Places in 1994.

== Description and history ==
The Morency Paint Shop and Apartment Building stands on the south side of Portland Street (United States Route 2), a mixed residential-commercial area east of downtown St. Johnsbury. It is a rambling 2 1/2-story wood-frame structure, with a cross-gable roof on the main section, and a series of extensions to the rear that bend around form an L shape. The exterior is finished in wooden clapboards, and it rests on a foundation of brick faced in concrete. A two-story porch extends across the front facade, with Victorian bracketed turned posts and turned balustrades. At the corner of the L there is also a two-story porch, with simpler styling. This section joins the main block to a former carriage house that has been converted to residential use. The interior is divided into apartments, some of which retain woodwork dating to the original construction, or to the early 20th century, when more of the building was converted from its commercial use.

The building was erected in 1890 by John Morency, and in its original layout it had his carriage painting business on the ground floor of the main block, residential units above, and the carriage barn at the back. The residential units were occupied by members of the extended Morency family, who were French Canadian immigrants. By 1905 the paint shop had been reduced to half of the main block ground floor. The property was foreclosed by the bank in 1915, and was eventually repurchased by Morency family members in 1929. It then remained in the family until 1963.

== See also ==
- National Register of Historic Places listings in Caledonia County, Vermont
