= Whittier House (Danville, Vermont) =

Historic house in Vermont, United States

- U.S. National Register of Historic Places
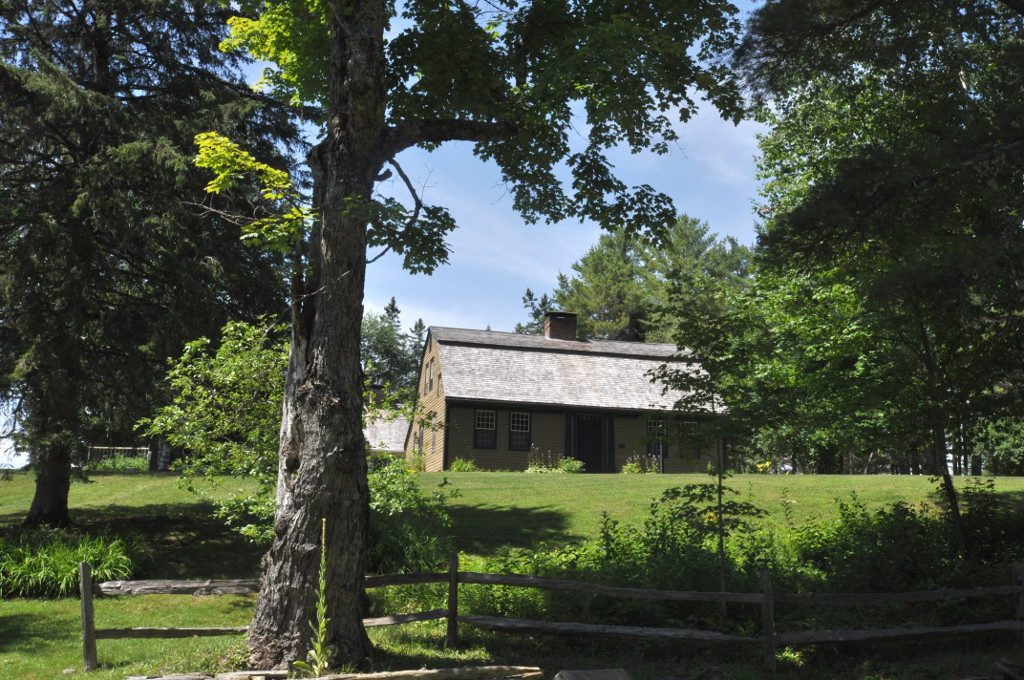

- Location within Vermont Location within the United States
- Location: Greenbanks Hollow Rd., Danville, Vermont
- Coordinates: 44°22′43″N 72°7′22″W
- Area: 0.8 acres (0.32 ha)
- Built: 1785
- Architectural style: Georgian
- NRHP reference No.: 84003456
- Added to NRHP: August 23, 1984

The Whittier House is a historic house on Greenbanks Hollow Road in Danville, Vermont. Built in 1785, it is significant as one of the town's oldest surviving buildings, and as an example of a gambrel-roofed Cape, a style rare in northern Vermont but common to Essex County, Massachusetts, where its builder was from. The house was listed on the National Register of Historic Places in 1984.

== Description and history ==
The Whittier House stands in a rural area of southern Danville, on the west side of Greenbanks Hollow Road a short way north of the Greenbanks Hollow Covered Bridge. It is a single-story wood-frame structure, with a gambrel roof, central chimney, and clapboarded exterior. Its main facade is five bays wide, with plain cornerboards and a narrow frieze. The center entrance has a Georgian surround, with sidelight windows and pilasters beneath a corniced entablature. The interior retains many features original to its period of construction, although its original large central chimney was replaced early in the 19th century. It follows a typical Georgian central chimney plan, with a narrow entry vestibule with winding stair, and parlor spaces on either side. These are noteworthy for the Georgian paneling on the end walls. At the time of its National Register listing in 1984, it lacked all modern amenities, including plumbing and electricity.

David Whittier, the builder of this house, was one of the first settlers of Danville, who was granted 200 acres (81 ha) in 1786. Whittier was from Methuen, Massachusetts, and likely styled this house after a form common to northeastern Massachusetts from the late 17th to mid-18th century. The gambrel roof form gave the upper level additional space, and conveyed a sense prosperity amid more conventionally built gabled Capes that were more common in northern Vermont. Greenbanks Hollow, where he built, was for some years a small thriving community, with a sawmill and gristmill. The mills burned in the late 19th century, leaving little more than foundations nearby.

== See also ==
- National Register of Historic Places listings in Caledonia County, Vermont
