= Caleb H. Marshall House =

Historic house in Vermont, United States

- U.S. National Register of Historic Places
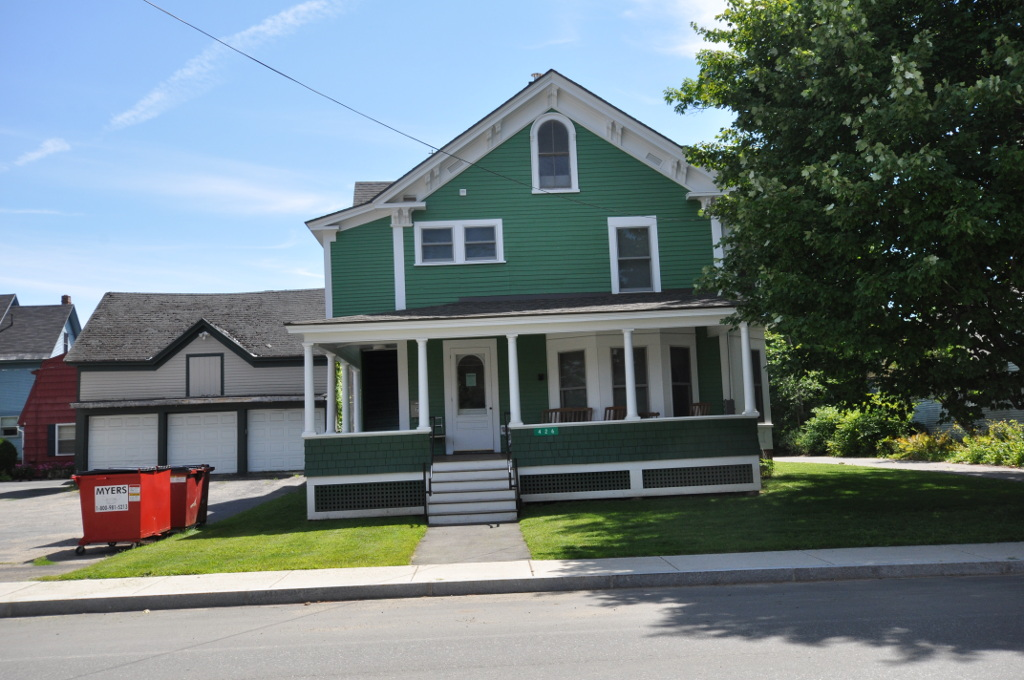

- Location within Vermont Location within the United States
- Location: 53 Summer St., St. Johnsbury, Vermont
- Coordinates: 44°25′17″N 72°1′18″W
- Area: less than one acre
- Built: 1858
- Architectural style: Italianate, Colonial Revival
- MPS: St. Johnsbury MPS
- NRHP reference No.: 94000868
- Added to NRHP: August 16, 1994

The Caleb H. Marshall House is a historic residential property at 53 Summer Street in St. Johnsbury, Vermont. Built about 1858 and repeatedly extended and altered, it has served as a private residence, an early example of a privately run sanatorium, and multiunit residential housing. It was listed on the National Register of Historic Places in 1994.

== Description and history ==
The Caleb H. Marshall House stands in a residential area west of downtown St. Johnsbury, on the east side of Summer Street, roughly midway between Winter and Church Streets. The property consists of a main house, which has a front-facing 2 1/2-story block with Italianate styling and a long rear ell, and a seven-car garage at the back of the lot. The front facade is two bays wide, with paired brackets in the gable eaves and a round-arch window near the gable peak. A Colonial Revival porch extends across the front and around to the left side, supported by round columns set on a shingled skirt. The entrance is in the left bay, with a polygonal window bay to the right. The right side of the main block also has projecting two-story bays, and the long ell has porches on the right side.

A house of some sort was standing on this lot when it was bought by Charles G. Marshall in 1853. Marshall's son Caleb, a brass finisher by trade, is credited with updating the house with its Italianate features in 1870. Marshall also was almost always taking in boarders, according to local census records. In 1919 his daughter sold the house to Harriet Frost, who operated what appears to be the first sanatorium in the town; it was probably established to handle cases of the 1918 influenza epidemic, and is the period from when the rear ell and the front porch date. Its use as a sanatorium ended in the 1930s, after which the rear sanatorium space was converted into apartments. The garage was added about 1940, around the time of the apartment conversion.

== See also ==
- National Register of Historic Places listings in Caledonia County, Vermont
