= District 6 School House =

- U.S. National Register of Historic Places
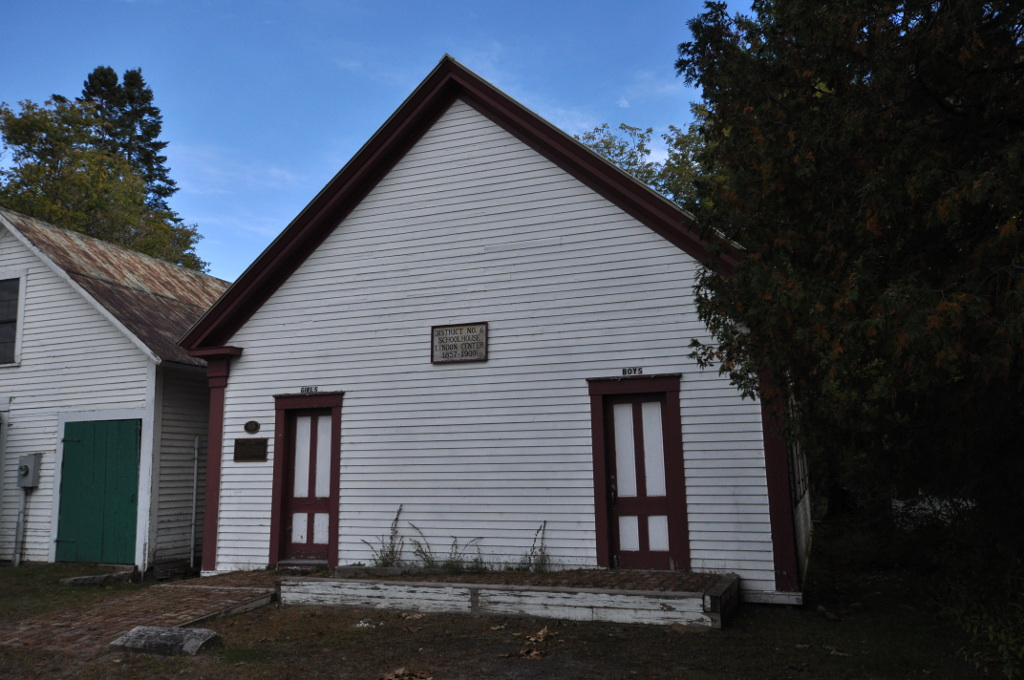

- Location within Vermont Location within the United States
- Location: 73 Cemetery Circle, Lyndon, Vermont
- Coordinates: 44°32′27″N 72°0′44″W
- Area: 0.3 acres (0.12 ha)
- Built: 1857
- Built by: Nichols, Hiram; Hubbard, Charles
- Architectural style: Greek Revival
- MPS: Educational Resources of Vermont MPS
- NRHP reference No.: 05001588
- Added to NRHP: February 1, 2006

The District 6 School House is a historic school building at 73 Cemetery Circle in Lyndon, Vermont. Built in 1857, it served as a school until 1900, and saw use in the 20th century as a garage, storage facility, and museum. It was listed on the National Register of Historic Places in 2006.

== Description and history ==
The former District 6 School House stands in the village of Lyndon Center, on the north side of Cemetery Circle. It is set just north of the town's 1809 town hall, and east of the village cemetery. It is single-story wood-frame structure, with a gabled roof, clapboarded exterior, and modern concrete foundation. The front facade is symmetrical and relatively plain, with a pair of entrances, each framed by pilasters and corniced entablature. The building corners are also pilastered. The interior has a reproduction of original flooring, but other features contemporary to its use as a schoolhouse have been preserved.

The school was built in 1857, and is one of the town's few surviving 19th-century district school buildings. It served as a school until 1900, and was closed after the town adopted consolidated schooling mandated by the state. It was then sold to the local fire district which used it for storage, and it then served as a service garage for the adjacent cemetery. It was given a meticulous restoration the 2000s by the local historical society for use as a local history museum.

== See also ==
- National Register of Historic Places listings in Caledonia County, Vermont
