= Lee Farm =

- U.S. National Register of Historic Places
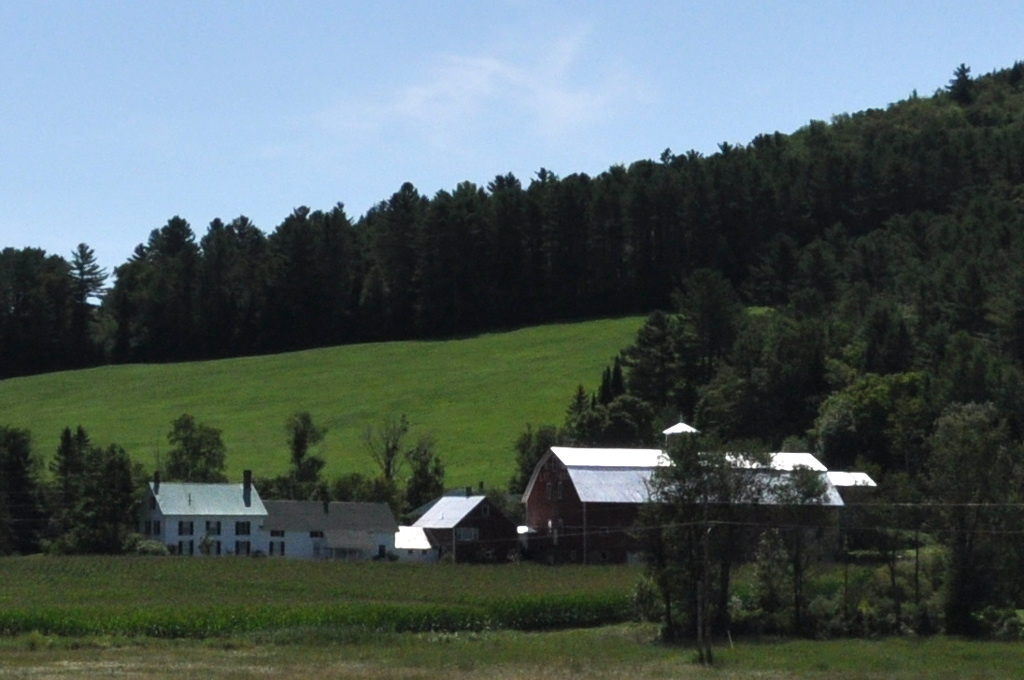

- Location within Vermont Location within the United States
- Location: VT 18, Waterford, Vermont
- Coordinates: 44°25′20″N 71°57′3″W
- Area: 5 acres (2.0 ha)
- Built: 1859
- Built by: Nathaniel Lee & Sons
- Architectural style: Greek Revival
- NRHP reference No.: 83003205
- Added to NRHP: May 26, 1983

Lee Farm is a historic farm property on Vermont Route 18 in Waterford, Vermont. Established in 1801, it was for many years worked by members of the Lee family, and part of a thriving rural community called Waterford Hollow. Its farmstead features surviving 19th and early 20th-century outbuildings and a high-quality Greek Revival farmhouse. A 5-acre (2.0 ha) portion of the farm, encompassing the farmstead, was listed on the National Register of Historic Places in 1983.

== Description and history ==
Lee Farm is located in northernmost Waterford, on the south side of Vermont Route 18 just east of its interchange with Interstate 93. The property is partially on a hillside west of Stiles Pond, and is readily visible from the highway. The farm consists of 187 acres (76 ha) of land, which see a mixture of agricultural uses, including crops, pasture, hay, and wood lots. The farmstead is set on either side of Town Highway 25, a spur road that acts as the farm driveway. Its buildings include a 2 1/2-story Greek Revival farmhouse, two barns, a former chicken coop, a 1 1/2-story tenant's residence, and an equipment shed.

The farm began as a roughly 300-acre (120 ha) parcel, which was purchased by John Lee in 1801. Its original farmstead, whose foundational remains survive, was originally located further up Waterford Mountain to the south. The Greek Revival farmhouse dates to about 1859, and was probably built by Lee's son Nathaniel after the original farmhouse burned down. The barn to which the house is attached dates to the 1860s, while the other is an early 20th-century structure. The farmhouse was a local landmark, in part because it was larger and of finer quality than many other farmhouses in the area, and the Lees were known to provide accommodations to travelers. The Stiles Pond area was for many years the location of a rural village, whose services were over time moved to nearby St. Johnsbury. The principal surviving element of the village is a small cemetery, located east of the Lee Farm.

== See also ==
- National Register of Historic Places listings in Caledonia County, Vermont
