= Darling Inn =

Historic former hotel in Vermont, US

- U.S. National Register of Historic Places
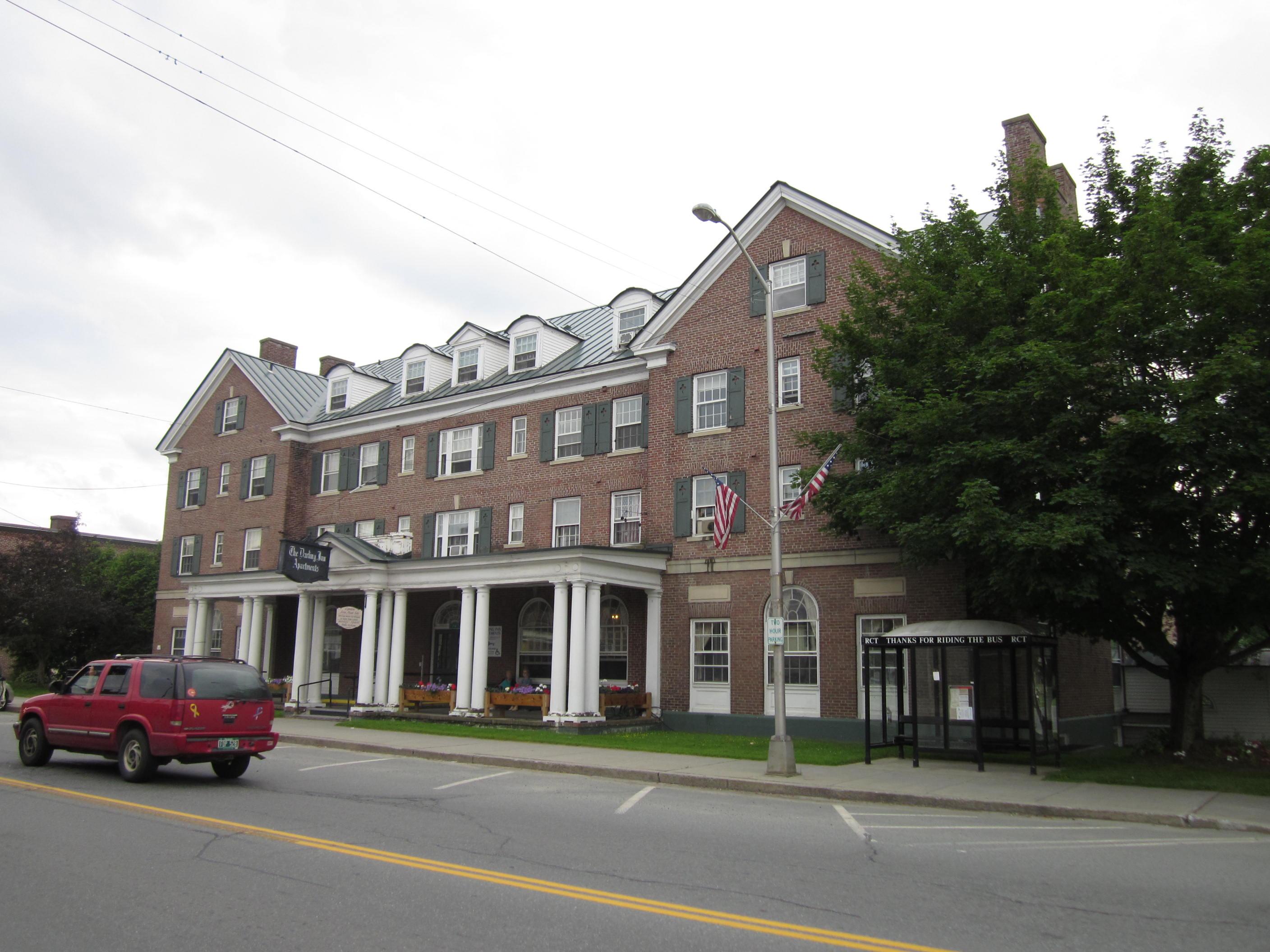

- Location within Vermont Location within the United States
- Location: 76 Depot St., Lyndonville, Vermont
- Coordinates: 44°32′3″N 72°0′16″W
- Area: 0.5 acres (0.20 ha)
- Built: 1927
- Built by: Rowe Construction
- Architect: Wells & Hudson
- Architectural style: Colonial Revival, Federal Revival
- NRHP reference No.: 80000386
- Added to NRHP: November 24, 1980

The Darling Inn is a historic former hotel building in the center of Lyndonville, Vermont. Built in 1927–28, it is a rare example in the state of an architecturally neo-Federal building, and one of the last major constructions during the state's Colonial Revival period. Now converted to a senior care facility, it was listed on the National Register of Historic Places in 1980.

== Description and history ==
The former Darling Inn building occupies a prominent position on Depot Street, downtown Lyndonville's short principal thoroughfare. It is a large 3-1/2 story brick building, occupying the western half of the block between Elm and Broad Streets. It is topped by a side gable roof, with slightly projecting front-facing gable sections at each end. Gabled and segmented-arch dormers project from the roof in between the two large gables. The central facade is dominated by a broad and deep porch, extending between the end gables, which is covered by a flat roof and supported by clustered columns. Marking the entrance at the center is a gabled pediment. Most windows are 8-over-8 sash, but those above the entrance have a Palladian pattern with narrow side windows flanking a central window. Ground-floor windows at the centers of the end gable sections are larger and set in round-arch openings.

The site where the Darling Inn stands has probably held a hotel since not long after the founding of Lyndonville in 1866. The Lyndon Hotel burned down in 1924, and a building committee of local businessmen was formed to develop a replacement. The land was owned by Elmore Darling, a local businessman and philanthropist who had retired from the hotel trade in New York City to his extensive estate north of the town. The principal design was by Wells and Hudson of Hanover, New Hampshire, but Darling personally designed the building's elaborately decorated dining room. At its opening in 1928, the hotel was described as Vermont's most opulent.

The Darling Inn was converted into nursing home in 1964, and has since been converted into apartments.

== See also ==
- National Register of Historic Places listings in Caledonia County, Vermont
