= Union Meeting House (Burke, Vermont) =

Historic church in Vermont, United States

- U.S. National Register of Historic Places
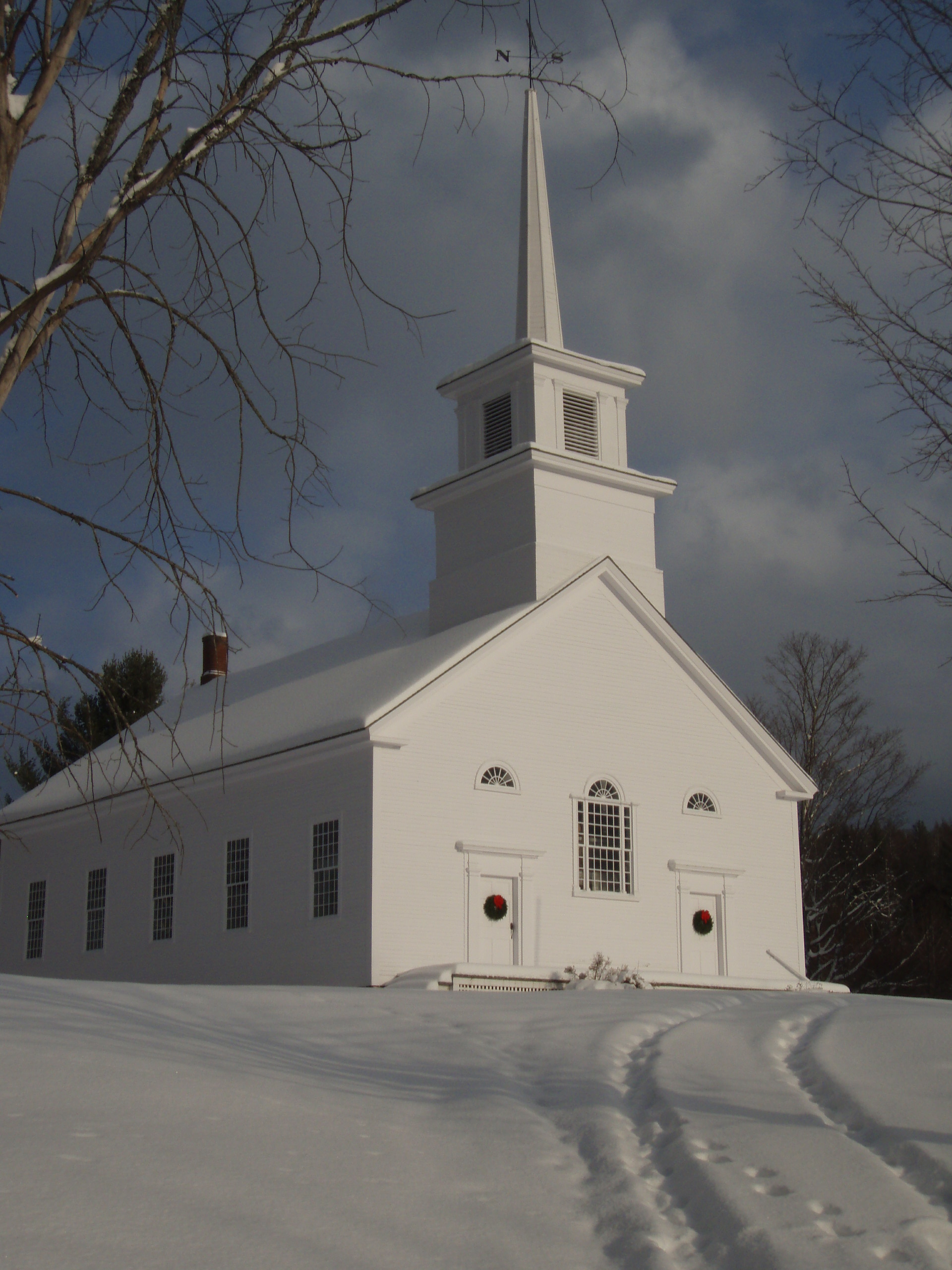

- Location within Vermont Location within the United States
- Location: 2614 Burke Hollow Rd., Burke, Vermont
- Coordinates: 44°37′20″N 71°56′55″W
- Area: 1.5 acres (0.61 ha)
- Built: 1826
- Architect: Armington, Ira; Clark, Seth Jr.
- Architectural style: Federal
- MPS: Religious Buildings, Sites and Structures in Vermont MPS
- NRHP reference No.: 07001345
- Added to NRHP: January 4, 2008

The Union Meeting House is a historic church at 2614 Burke Hollow Road in Burke, Vermont. Completed in 1826 as a worship space for four congregations, it is a well-preserved example of vernacular Federal architecture. It was listed on the National Register of Historic Places in 2008.

== Description and history ==
The Union Meeting House is located on the east side of the rural village of Burke Hollow, on the north side of Burke Hollow Road east of the village's central intersection. It is a 1 1/2-story wood-frame structure, with a gabled roof and clapboarded exterior. A three-stage square tower rises near the front of the roof, with a pilastered belfry stage topped by a narrow spire. The front facade is three bays wide, with a pair of entrances flanking a raised Palladian window. The entrances are each framed by pilasters and topped by corniced entablatures, and there are half-round fanlight windows above them, at the same level as the equivalent element of the central window. The interior retains many original 19th-century features, including box pews, and a pulpit placed at the front of the building instead of the more common rear.

The town of Burke was chartered in 1782 and first settled in the 1790s. Early religious meetings were typically held by itinerant ministers in private residences and barns, and there was early disagreement about which denomination an officially settled minister should belong to. Church and state were officially separated in Vermont in 1806. In 1825 a union committee was formed by local Baptist, Congregationalist, Methodist, and Universalist groups to oversee construction of this building, which was completed in 1826. All of the original congregations either died out or abandoned the building by 1870. The building, a good example of vernacular Federal period architecture, was included in Herbert Wheaton Congdon's important Old Vermont Houses, in which he described the evolution of meeting house forms in rural Vermont. Local philanthropist Elmer Darling established a trust fund for the building's restoration and maintenance on the 100th anniversary of its construction.

== See also ==
- National Register of Historic Places listings in Caledonia County, Vermont
