= Lower Waterford Congregational Church =

Historic church in Vermont, United States

- U.S. National Register of Historic Places
- Lower Waterford Congregational Church in 2025

- Location within Vermont Location within the United States
- Location: 63 Lower Waterford Rd., Waterford, Vermont
- Coordinates: 44°21′17″N 71°54′27″W
- Area: 0.25 acres (0.10 ha)
- Built: 1859
- Architectural style: Greek Revival
- NRHP reference No.: 100004181
- Added to NRHP: July 8, 2019

The Lower Waterford Congregational Church is a historic church at 63 Lower Waterford Road in Waterford, Vermont. Built in 1859, it is a prominent local example of Greek Revival architecture. The building was listed on the National Register of Historic Places in 2019. Signage on the church building has been removed.

== Description and history ==
The Lower Waterford Congregational Church stands prominently in the small village of Lower Waterford, at the junction of Lower Waterford Road and Maple Street. It is a two-story rectangular wood-frame structure set on a stone foundation, with white clapboard siding and a gabled roof. A square tower rises from the northern end of the roof, topped by an octagonal spire. The tower has two stages, each with a hipped roof and louvered openings on each side. The front facade has two symmetrically placed entrances on either side of a tall window. All three elements are capped by a shallow peaked lintel. The building's corner boards are paneled, with an entablature extending along the sides.

The church was built in 1859 for a congregation established in 1798; it was that organization's second edifice, built on the site of the first, which was destroyed by fire in 1857. Francis Rice Carpenter, a church deacon and joiner, directed construction of that building. Charles Richardson is sited as the carpenter of the third house of worship, this one built with timbers from Abial Richardson's meetinghouse, which was torn down. It was apparently designed to serve a broader array of community functions, and housed Waterford's annual town meetings until 1957. It continues to serve both civic and religious functions, hosting historical society events and meetings of the town selectmen.

The National Register listing was the result of a process begun in 2017 by formation of a committee including a town selectman, a town librarian, the Waterford Historical Society and church leaders.

== See also ==
- National Register of Historic Places listings in Caledonia County, Vermont
