= Riverside (Lyndonville, Vermont) =

Historic house in Vermont, United States

- U.S. National Register of Historic Places
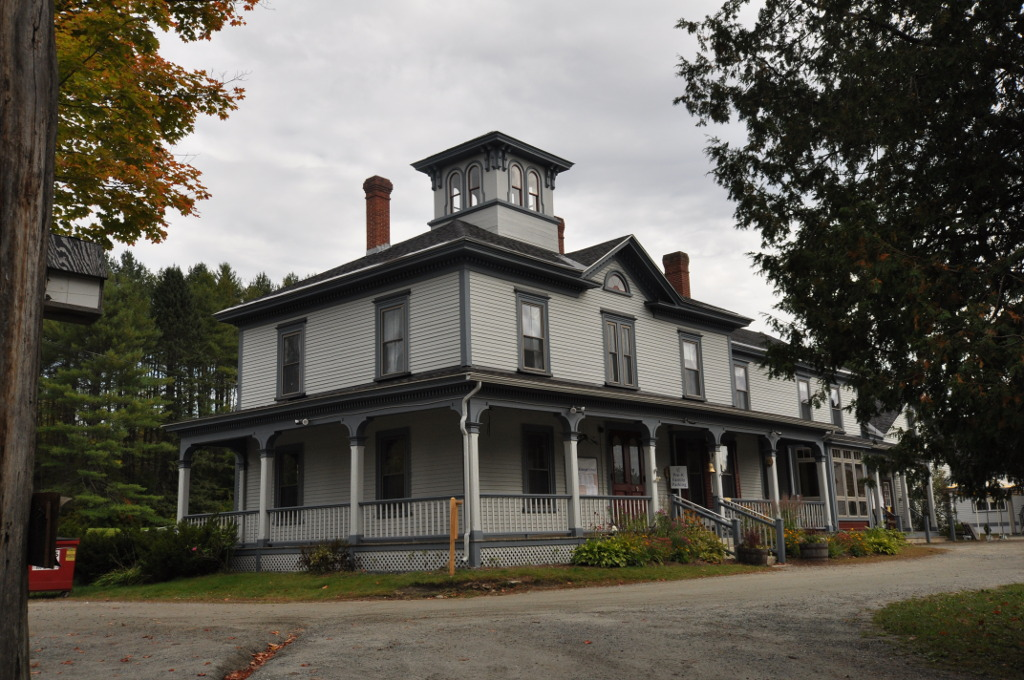

- Location within Vermont Location within the United States
- Location: 30 Lily Pond Rd., Lyndon, Vermont
- Coordinates: 44°30′47″N 71°59′40″W
- Area: 8 acres (3.2 ha)
- Built: 1866
- Architect: Ropes, George, Jr.
- Architectural style: Italianate
- NRHP reference No.: 93000532
- Added to NRHP: June 17, 1993

Riverside is a historic estate at 30 Lily Pond Road in Lyndon, Vermont. Built in 1866 for the owner of a local lumber mill, it is a well-preserved example of Italianate architecture, including significant elements on the main house and the surviving outbuildings. The estate, now home to a private elementary day school, was listed on the National Register of Historic Places in 1993.

== Description and history ==
The Riverside estate is located south of downtown Lyndon, on the east side of Lily Pond Road at its junction with Red Village Road. The estate now covers about 8 acres (3.2 ha), most of which is on the east side of Lily Pond and Red Village Roads; a small portion is on the west side of Red Village Road. The property includes three buildings: the main house, a barn, and a granary. All were built between 1866 and about 1880, and exhibit Italianate styling. The house is 2 1/2 stories in height, with a hip roof topped by an elaborate square belvidere. A porch wraps around two sides of the main block, supported by chamfered square posts with brackets at their tops, and with spindled balustrades. Its interior retains original period decorative elements. A 2 1/2-story gabled ell extends to the right side. East of the house stands a c. 1866 barn, whose Italianate features include a small square cupola, and a smaller c. 1880 granary, which has an octagonal cupola and bracketed eaves.

Riverside was built in 1866 for Dudley P. Hall, one of the principal owners of a lumber mill located just south of the property, on the banks of the Passumpsic River. It was designed by George Ropes Jr., an architect from Boston, Massachusetts, and stood next to the home of his business partner, B.F. Lincoln (now adapted for use as a nursing home). Members of the Hall family owned the property until 1977, and it has served since then as the private Riverside School, serving grades four through eight.

== See also ==
- National Register of Historic Places listings in Caledonia County, Vermont
