= Grouselands =

Historic house in Vermont, United States

- U.S. National Register of Historic Places
- Location within Vermont Location within the United States
- Location: McDowell Rd., Danville, Vermont
- Coordinates: 44°29′38″N 72°7′14″W
- Area: 2.5 acres (1.0 ha)
- Built: 1865
- Architect: Waterman, Stephen
- Architectural style: Colonial Revival, Queen Anne, Shingle Style
- NRHP reference No.: 83004224
- Added to NRHP: December 22, 1983

Grouselands, also known more recently as the Waterman Farm, is a historic farm and country estate on McDowell Road in Danville, Vermont. The main house is a distinctive and rare example of Shingle style architecture in northern Vermont, and is the product of a major redesign of an Italianate farmhouse built in the 1860s. The house and immediate surrounding outbuildings were listed on the National Register of Historic Places in 1983.

== Description and history ==
Grouselands stands in a rural area of northern Danville, on the west side of McDowell Road south of its junction with Wheelock Road. It is, at first glance, a typical 19th-century New England connected farmstead, with a main house, side wing, and barn stretched in a line from north to south. The main house is a gambrel-roofed structure, clad in wooden shingles, with a pair of interior brick chimneys, a hip-roof dormer projecting from the upper roof, and shed-roof dormers on the steep part of the gambrel, their roofs continuing the pitch of the upper roof. It is three bays wide, with a single-story porch that runs along the left two bays and around the corner toward the recessed ell. This porch is supported by Doric columns and adds a note of the Colonial Revival to the facade. An older porch extends along part of the recessed ell; it has paneled square columns and brackets in the Italianate style, reflective of the house's early appearance.

The property was known to have been settled as a farm as early as 1799, and went through a number of owners in the 19th century, especially during the period of the 1860s, when this house was probably built. It was at that time a somewhat typically Italianate structure (as shown in early 20th-century photos), and was operated as an inn for a period of time in the late 19th century. It was purchased in 1903 by Stephen Waterman, an architect from Rhode Island, who oversaw its complete transformation into the Shingle style structure present today. Waterman's estate also included tennis courts and a nine-hole golf course.

== See also ==
- National Register of Historic Places listings in Caledonia County, Vermont
