= Mathewson Block =

- U.S. National Register of Historic Places
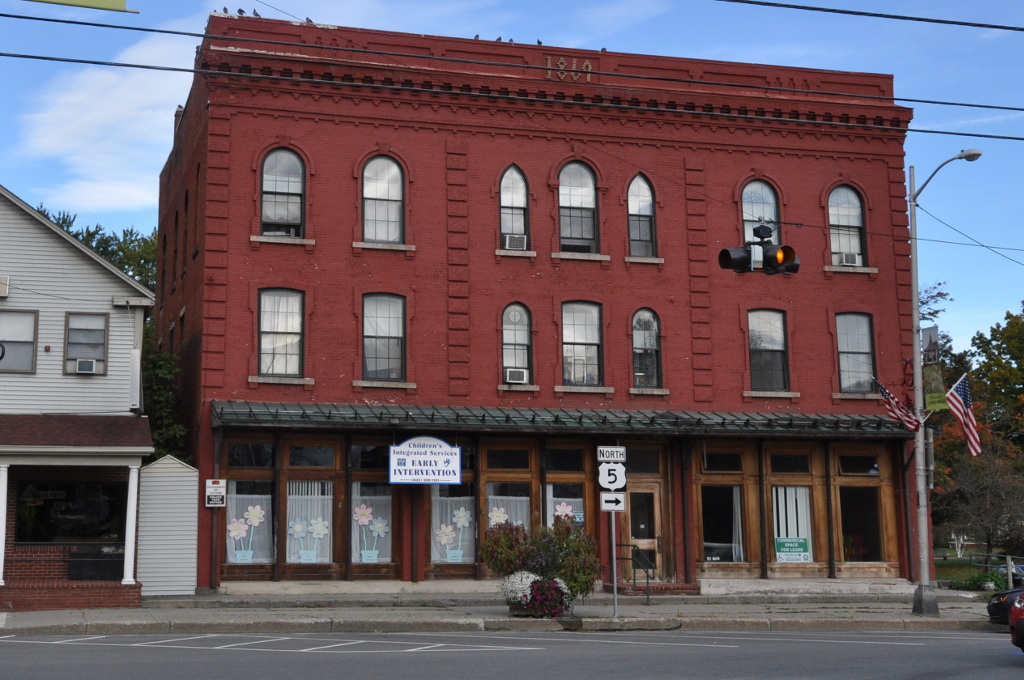

- Location within Vermont Location within the United States
- Location: 101 Main St., Lyndon, Vermont
- Coordinates: 44°32′7″N 72°0′21″W
- Area: 0.3 acres (0.12 ha)
- Built: 1869
- Architectural style: Italianate
- NRHP reference No.: 99000623
- Added to NRHP: May 20, 1999

The Mathewson Block is a historic commercial building at 101 Main Street in the center of Lyndonville, Vermont. Built in 1869, it was the first brick commercial building erected in Lyndonville, which was founded in 1866. It was listed on the National Register of Historic Places in 1999.

== Description and history ==
The Mathewson Block occupies a prominent position in downtown Lyndonville, facing east toward Depot Street, the main street of the business district from the west side of Main Street. It is a three-story brick structure with Italianate styling. Its ground floor storefronts are modern, while the upper floors have seven bays organized into a 2-3-2 pattern by quoined brick pilasters. Second floor windows are mainly set in segmented-arch windows, while third floor windows are a combination of round-arch and Gothic-arch openings. A decorative brick cornice and parapet extend along the top of the building on the front and sides. The building interior was extensively damaged by fire in 1996, but has been rehabilitated. The upper floors are used for housing.

The village of Lyndonville was established in 1866, after a fire extensively damaged railroad facilities in St. Johnsbury to the south, and railroad executives decides to relocate rail facilities to this area. A planned railroad community, the Mathewson Block was built in 1869 by George Mathewson, a businessman who owned a sawmill and a small metal stamp factory. The building was an immediate success, housing commercial tenants even before it was finished, with an auditorium space for social meetings on the upper floor. It is the only major building in the downtown area to survive two fires that swept the area.

== See also ==
- National Register of Historic Places listings in Caledonia County, Vermont
