= William and Agnes Gilkerson Farm =

- U.S. National Register of Historic Places
- U.S. Historic district
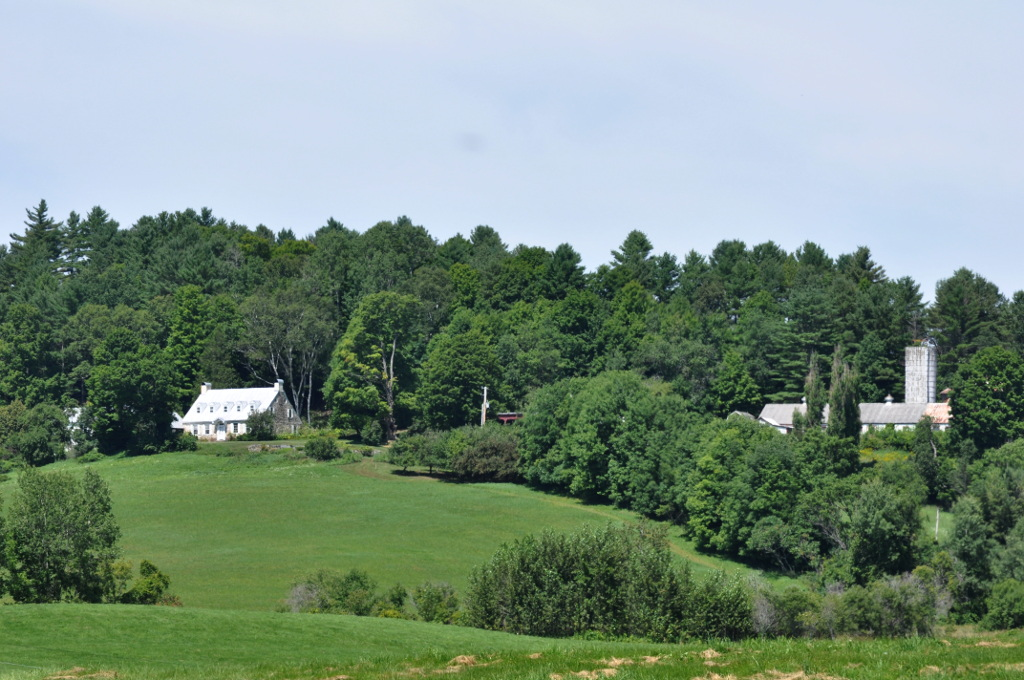

- Location within Vermont Location within the United States
- Location: Town Hwy. 5 W of jct. with US 5, Barnet, Vermont
- Coordinates: 44°25′2″N 72°1′39″W
- Area: 60 acres (24 ha)
- Built: 1799
- Architectural style: Cape Cod
- MPS: Agricultural Resources of Vermont MPS
- NRHP reference No.: 92001504
- Added to NRHP: October 29, 1992

The William and Agnes Gilkerson Farm, also known more recently as the Kitchel Hill Farm, is a historic farmstead on Kitchel Hill Road in Barnet, Vermont. Established in the late 18th century by Scottish immigrants, it includes one of the finest known examples of a rubblestone farmhouse in the region. The property was listed on the National Register of Historic Places in 1992.

== Description and history ==
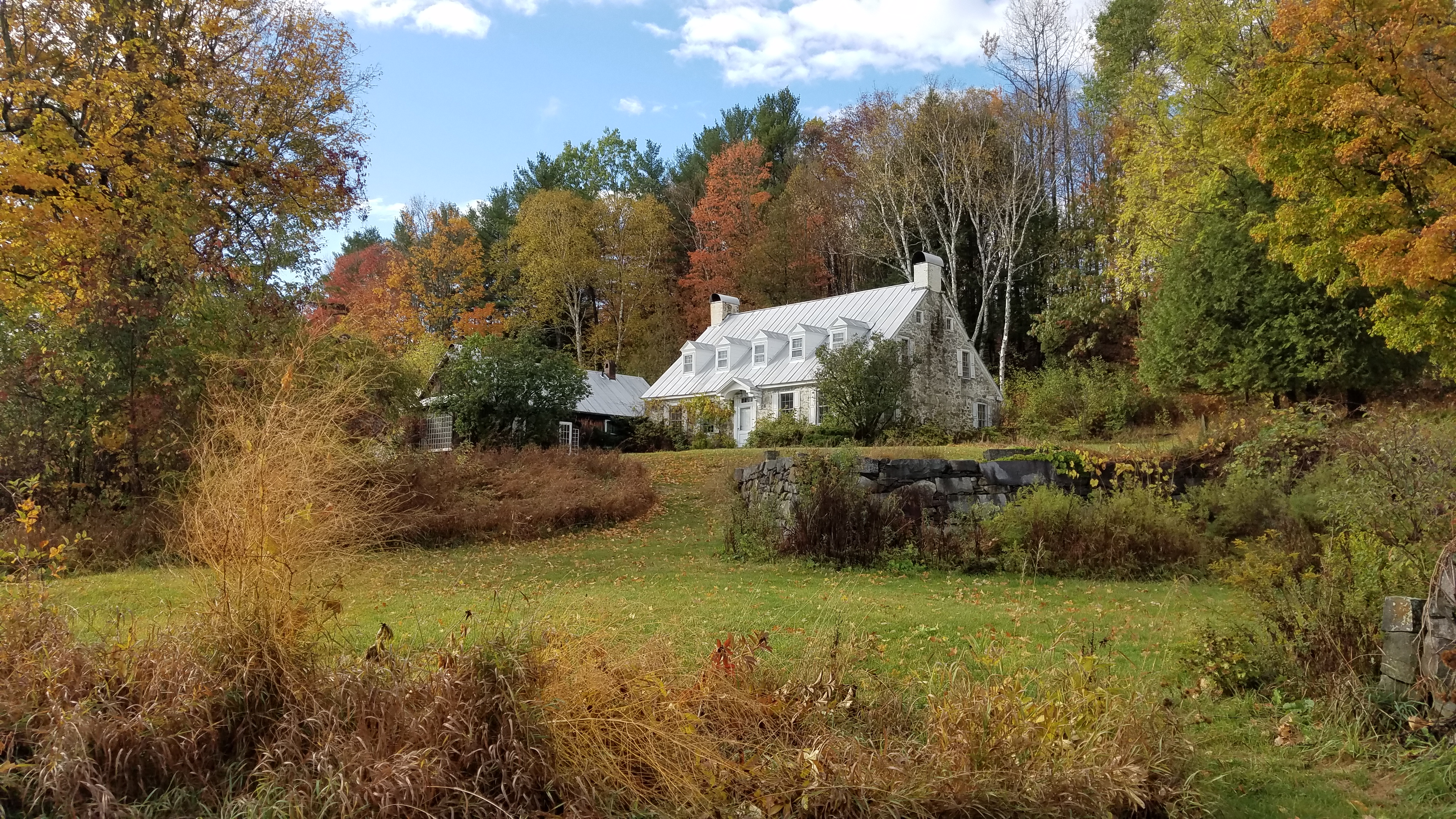
The Gilkerson House pictured in October of 2020

The Gilkerson farm property consists of 60 acres (24 ha) of hillside farmland in northern Barnet, on the north side of Kitchel Hill Road. The lower portions of the property are in agriculture, while the upper portions are forested. The farmstead is located in the southern (lower) half of the property, with its access drive near a bend in the road. There are four small clusters of buildings: the main house with an attached barn, a sugar house and toolshed, and two barn complexes. The main house is a 1-1/2 story Cape style structure, sited with a commanding view of the Connecticut River valley and the White Mountains of New Hampshire. It is built out of rubblestone mortared with lime. Its metal roof is pierced by five dormers.

William Gilkerson (b. 1774) came to Vermont with his parents as a child in the 1780s; they were among a settlers who came as a group from Stirlingshire in Scotland. Gilkerson in 1802 married Agnes Somers, who had also immigrated from Scotland with her parents and settled in Barnet. It is thought that this house was built by Gilkerson as a suitable home for his bride, a task that probably took three years. The house is one of four in the regions that have clearly Scottish roots; of those, it is the largest and best preserved. Most of the outbuildings are 20th-century additions.

== See also ==
- National Register of Historic Places listings in Caledonia County, Vermont
