= Centre Covered Bridge =

- U.S. National Register of Historic Places
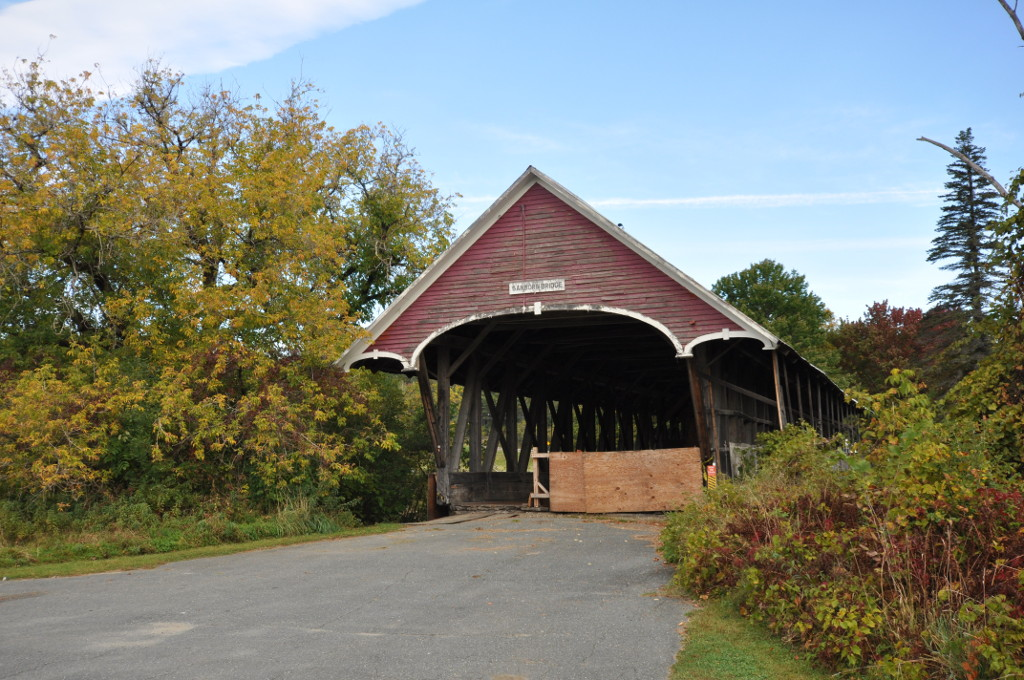

- Location within Vermont Location within the United States
- Location: Off US 5 across the Passumpsic River, north of Lyndonville, Vermont
- Coordinates: 44°32′39″N 72°0′3″W
- Area: 1 acre (0.40 ha)
- Built: 1872
- Architectural style: Paddleford truss
- NRHP reference No.: 74000204 AD74000204
- Added to NRHP: June 20, 1974; Amended June 10, 2024

The Centre Covered Bridge, also known as the Sanborn Covered Bridge, is a historic covered bridge, spanning the Passumpsic River next to U.S. Route 5 (US 5) north of the village of Lyndonville, Vermont. Built in 1872, it was moved to its present location and taken out of service in 1960. The bridge was located on Center Street between Lyndonville and Lyndon Center. It is one of three surviving Paddleford truss bridges in Vermont. It was listed on the National Register of Historic Places in 1974. An amended National Register of Historic Places registration form was accepted by the National Park Service in 2024. The amendment fully documents the history and significance of the Centre Covered Bridge and lists it at the national level of significance.

== Description and history ==
The Centre Covered Bridge is located just west (downstream) of US 5 on the northern outskirts of the village of Lyndonville. It is a single-span Paddleford truss structure, set on concrete abutments, and is oriented north–south across the Passumpsic River. It is 118 feet (36 m) long and 20 feet (6.1 m) wide, with a roadway width of 17.5 feet (5.3 m). What is left of its deteriorating deck is made of wooden planking. The bridge is covered by a metal roof with very long eaves, and has vertical board siding extending over the lower half of the trusses on the sides. The portals project beyond the ends of the trusses, and are also sheathed in vertical boards. The portal openings are framed as segmented arches. A sidewalk (also with deteriorated and unusable decking) is cantilevered on the outside of the east side.

The bridge was built in 1872, and was originally located about one mile (1.6 km) to the south, providing access between Lyndonville and Lyndon Center. It was moved in 1960 to its present location, at which time it was closed to traffic. The bridge is one of three surviving Paddleford truss bridges in the state, and is the longest of those three. The outside walkway is one of five such features found on covered bridges in the state. At the time of its nomination, a real estate office occupied a portion of the bridge. It was removed some time after 1980.

== See also ==
- List of covered bridges in Vermont
- National Register of Historic Places listings in Caledonia County, Vermont
- List of bridges on the National Register of Historic Places in Vermont
