= Maple Street–Clarks Avenue Historic District =

Historic district in Vermont, United States

- U.S. National Register of Historic Places
- U.S. Historic district
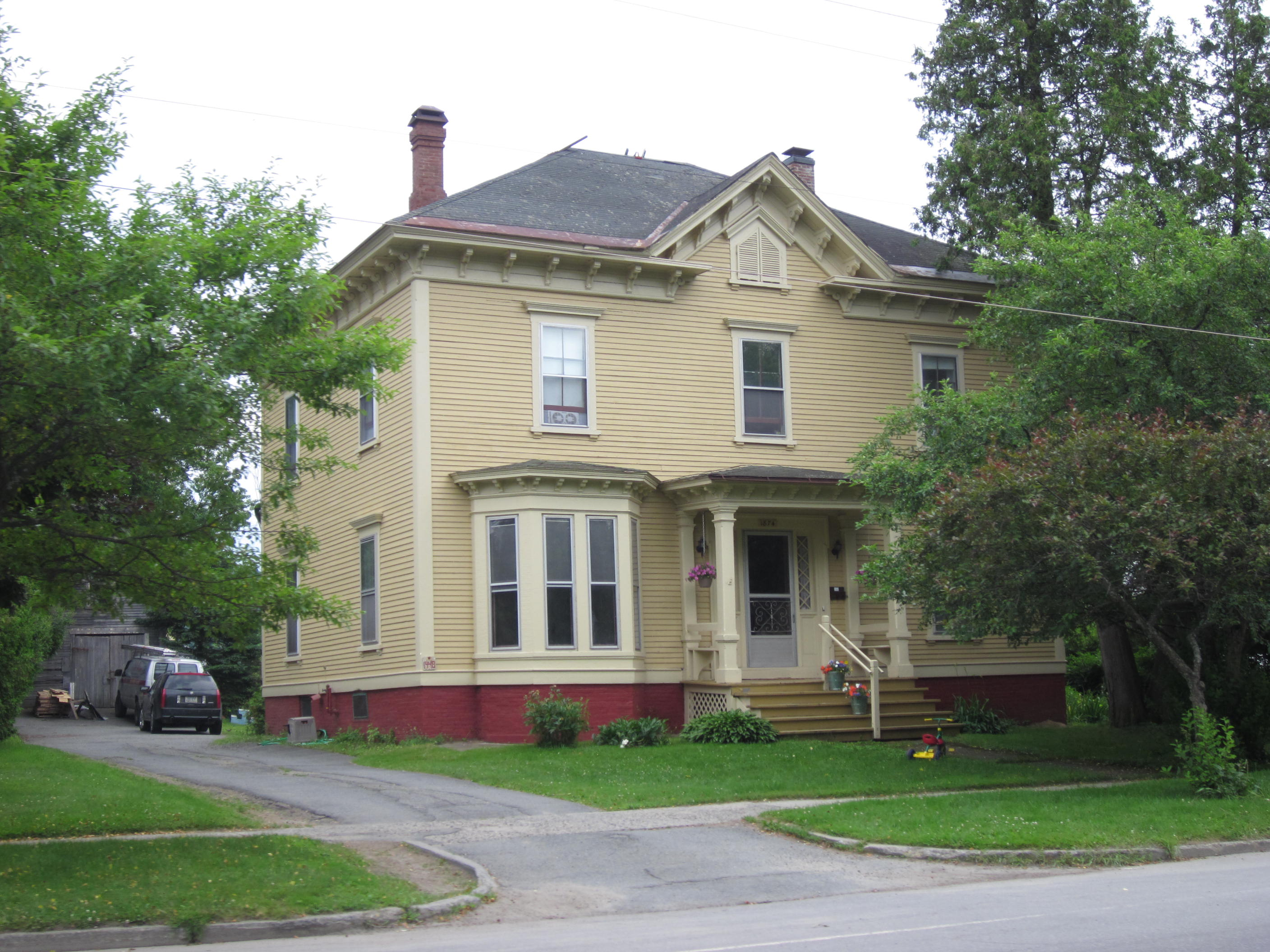
- House on Main Street

- Location within Vermont Location within the United States
- Location: 17-49 Maple St., 4-34 Clarks Ave., 95 1/2-101 Main St., 4 and 6 Frost Ave. and 3 and 5 Idlewood Terr., St. Johnsbury, Vermont
- Coordinates: 44°25′18″N 72°1′4″W
- Area: 6 acres (2.4 ha)
- Built: 1850
- Built by: Carpenter, Horace; LaPointe, Samuel
- Architectural style: Greek Revival, Italianate, Second Empire
- MPS: St. Johnsbury MPS
- NRHP reference No.: 94000381
- Added to NRHP: May 5, 1994

The Maple Street–Clarks Avenue Historic District encompasses a historic 19th-century immigrant neighborhood of St. Johnsbury, Vermont. Located northwest of the downtown area on a sloping hillside, it consists of tenements and single-family houses built for Irish and French Canadian immigrants, sometimes grouped in ways that facilitated the support of large extended families. The district was listed on the National Register of Historic Places in 1994.

== Description and history ==
The town of St. Johnsbury flourished in the second half of the 19th century, following the arrival of the first railroad line in 1850, and the success of the Fairbanks Scale Company, a major local employer. Prior to the 1850s, the area was owned by members of the Clark family, whose early Cape houses still stand on Main Street. Maple Street was laid out east–west from the northern end of the business district to the Main Street area, directly up a relatively steep hillside, with Clarks Avenue laid out later, taking a more winding path up the hillside to the north. Much of Maple Street was built out with modest single-family and tenement houses by the 1870s, when another railroad line brought additional jobs to the area. This spurred further development along Clarks Avenue. By the early 20th century, some of the immigrants and descendants of early immigrants built finer homes as infill on the spur roads of Frost Avenue and Idlewild Terrace; houses on the latter are afforded fine views to the east.

The historic district is bounded on the west by Main Street Historic District. It includes all of the houses on Clarks Avenue, Idlewild Terrace, and Frost Avenue, and those on the north side of Maple Avenue. The primarily buildings are all residential, 1-1/2 to 2 1/2 stories in height, and of wood-frame construction. Most were built between 1850 and 1890, and stylistically reflect vernacular interpretations of the Greek Revival and Italianate periods. The smaller number of early 20th-century houses include modest examples of the Tudor Revival on Idlewild Terrace and transitional Queen Anne/Colonial Revival on Frost Avenue. In a number of places, the buildings are organized in distinctive courtyard arrangements, a method employed by French Canadian immigrant families to facilitate the support and social activities of large extended families.

== See also ==
- National Register of Historic Places listings in Caledonia County, Vermont
