= Phineas Thurston House =

Historic house in Vermont, United States

- U.S. National Register of Historic Places
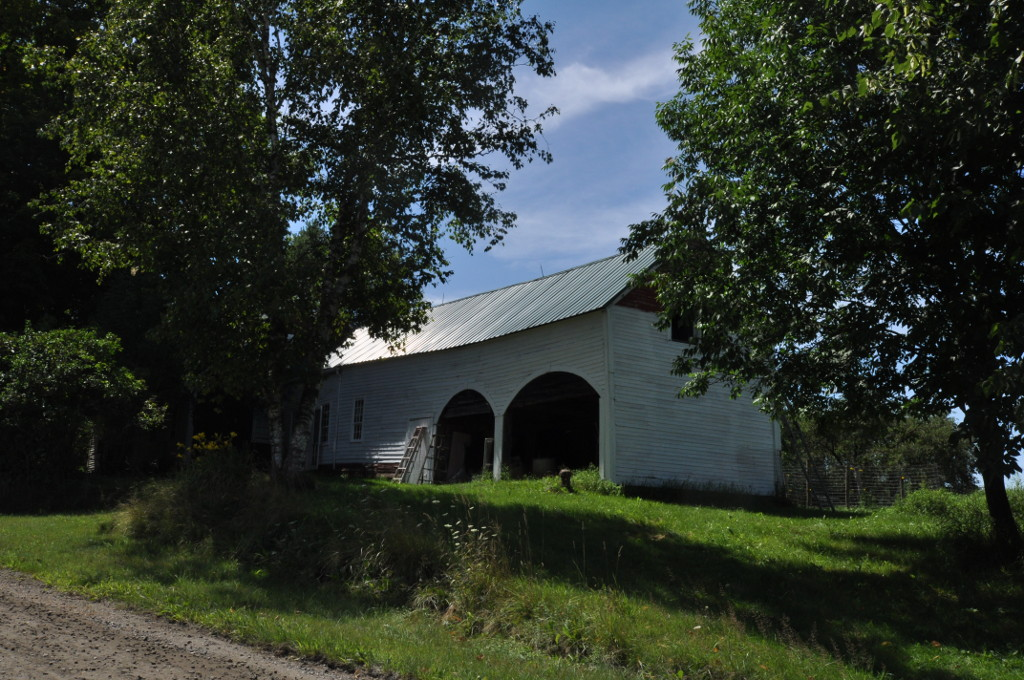

- Location within Vermont Location within the United States
- Location: Barnet Town Hwy. 12 (Old Silo Rd.), Barnet, Vermont
- Coordinates: 44°21′56″N 72°1′29″W
- Area: 1 acre (0.40 ha)
- Built: 1787
- Architectural style: Cape Cod
- NRHP reference No.: 89001788
- Added to NRHP: October 30, 1989

The Phineas Thurston House is a historic house on Old Silo Road (Town Highway 12) in Barnet, Vermont. Built about 1787, it is one of the oldest surviving houses in northeastern Vermont, and one of the best-preserved early houses in Barnet. It was listed on the National Register of Historic Places in 1989.

== Description and history ==
The Phineas Thurston House stands in a rural area of northeastern Barnet, on the west side of Old Silo Road. It is a 1 1/2-story wood-frame structure, with a gabled roof and clapboarded exterior. A single-story ell extends to the north, ending in two carriage bays with keystoned arched openings. The main facade is five bays wide, with nine-over-six sash windows, and a center entrance with an original paneled door and transom window. The interior follows a typical central-chimney plan, although the chimney itself has been removed. The entrance opens into a narrow vestibule, with a winding stair to the attic level, with chambers on either side of the chimney space. There are three rooms along the rear, traditionally a pantry and borning room. The ell housed the summer kitchen. The interior retains much original woodwork and decorative features, with restorative work performed using period materials from other houses.

Barnet was first settled in 1770, but significant growth did not begin until after the American Revolutionary War. Phineas Thurston was part of that wave of settlement, arriving in 1787. He purchased 400 acres (160 ha) of land, and probably built this house within the following year, using lumber from a recently established nearby sawmill. Based on a survey of period Cape houses in the region performed in 1976, this is one of the best-preservered, and is particularly distinguished by its early ell and carriage bays. The house has been separated in ownership from the surrounding land, which is still used for agriculture.

== See also ==
- National Register of Historic Places listings in Caledonia County, Vermont
