= Benoit Apartments =

Historic place in Vermont, United States

- Benoit Apartment House-76 Pearl Street [sic]
- U.S. National Register of Historic Places
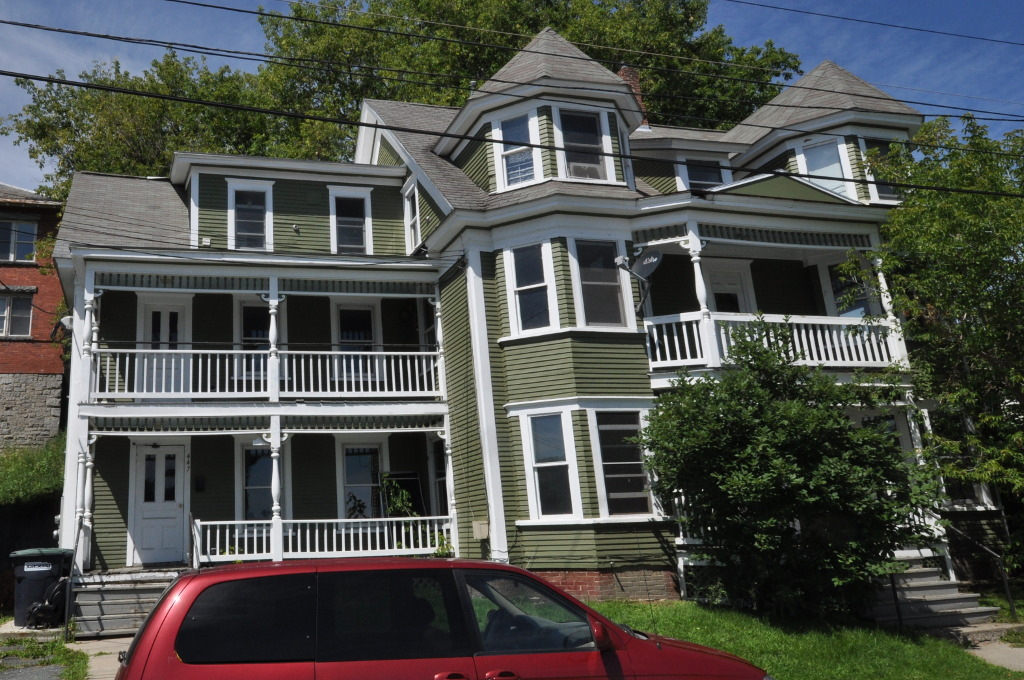
- 447 Pearl Street (formerly numbered 76)

- Location within Vermont Location within the United States
- Location: 447 Pearl St., St. Johnsbury, Vermont
- Coordinates: 44°25′9″N 72°1′2″W
- Area: less than one acre
- Built: 1900
- Architectural style: Italianate, Queen Anne
- MPS: St. Johnsbury MPS
- NRHP reference No.: 94000379
- Added to NRHP: May 6, 1994

The Benoit Apartments are a pair of apartment houses at 439 and 447 Pearl Street in St. Johnsbury, Vermont. Both were built around the turn of the 20th century, and are well-preserved examples of Colonial Revival and Queen Anne architecture, respectively, with a long period of common ownership. They were each listed individually on the National Register of Historic Places in 1994, in listings that included street numbers current to that period.

== 439 Pearl Street ==
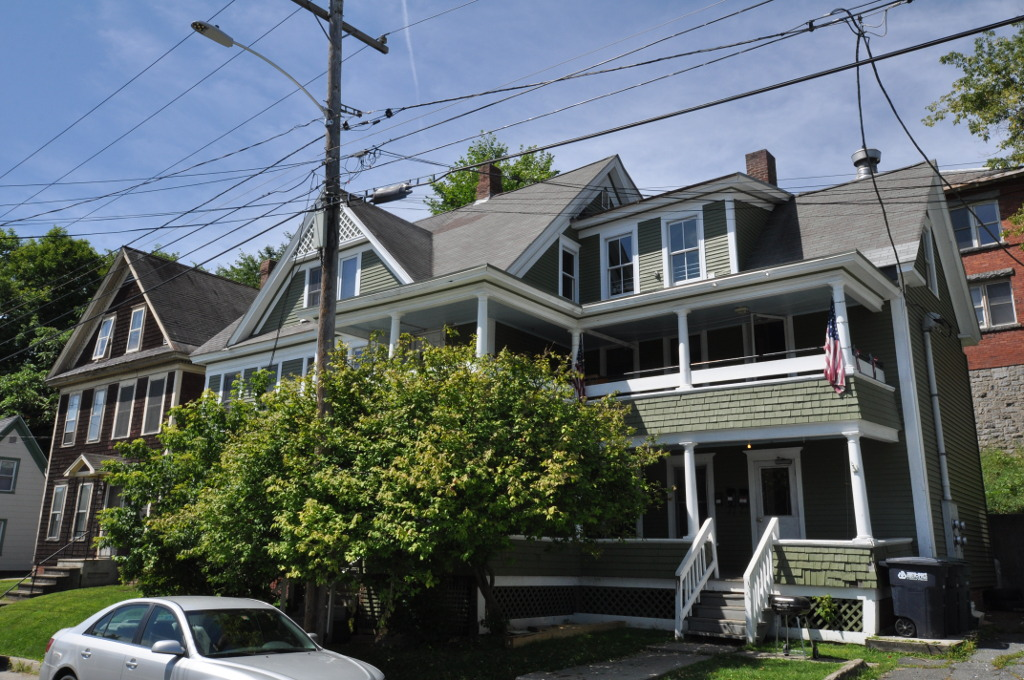
439 Pearl Street

439 Pearl Street (formerly 74 Pearl Street) is a 2-1/2 story wood frame structure with a gabled roof and clapboard exterior. Its styling is relatively modest, with plain cornerboards, and porches supported by Tuscan columns mounted above shingled half-walls. The most elaborate element is a cross gable on the main portion of the building, which has a Queen Anne-style lattice screen at the peak of the gable, and a recessed window below. The interior retains original woodwork and other features, although it is not particularly elaborate.

== 447 Pearl Street ==
447 Pearl Street (formerly 76 Pearl Street) is, like its neighbor, a 2-1/2 story wood frame structure with a gabled roof. Its exterior is distinguished from the other by its projecting polygonal bays, which are topped by turreted roofs, and the turned posts and spindled friezes of its porches. The interior retains many original features, and has a particularly elaborate main staircase.

== History ==
The lots for these two houses were subdivided in 1892 from a parcel that housed the local jail. They were purchased in 1893 by Virginia Benoit, widow of a local barber. Maps of the period show that #439 was completed by 1894, and that construction of #447 was underway in 1900. In a 1904-05 directory of the town, Virginia Benoit was listed as being resident at #447, along with other family members. In 1912, they were sold to Edgar Roy, a blacksmith. Both houses remained in common ownership, and were eventually acquired by the local housing authority, which rehabilitated them in the 1990s.

== See also ==
- National Register of Historic Places listings in Caledonia County, Vermont
