= Greenbanks Hollow Covered Bridge =

- U.S. National Register of Historic Places
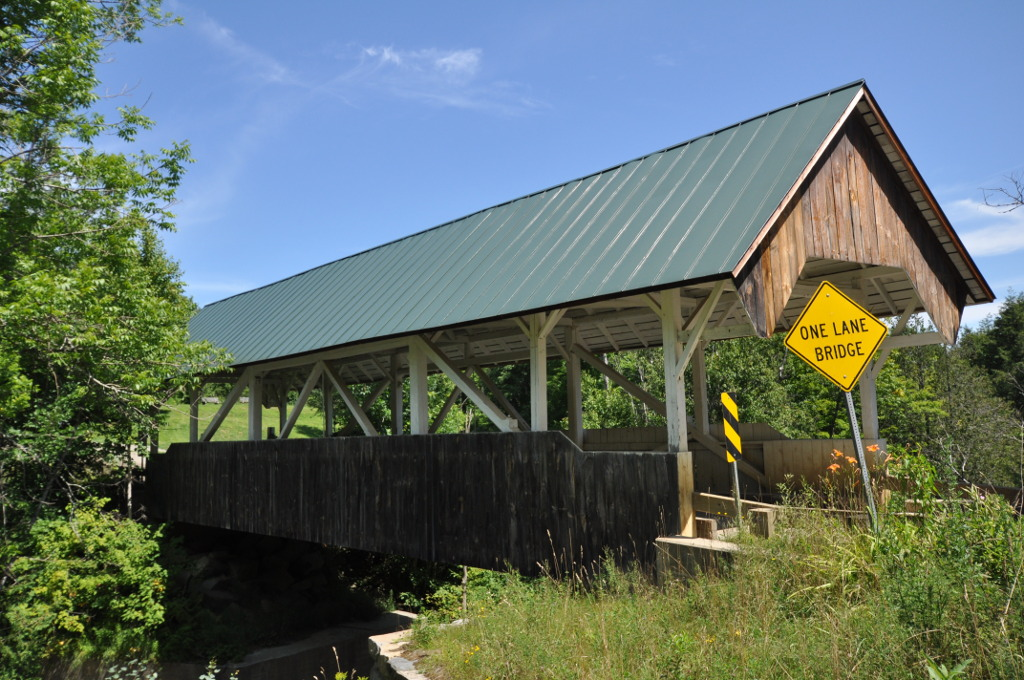

- Location within Vermont Location within the United States
- Location: Greenbanks Hollow Rd. over Joes Brook, Danville, Vermont
- Coordinates: 44°22′38″N 72°7′20″W
- Area: 1 acre (0.40 ha)
- Architectural style: queenpost truss
- NRHP reference No.: 74000206
- Added to NRHP: June 13, 1974

The Greenbanks Hollow Covered Bridge is a historic covered bridge built in 1886, carrying Greenbanks Hollow Road across Joes Brook in southern Danville, Vermont. It is the only surviving 19th-century covered bridge in the town. It was listed on the National Register of Historic Places in 1974.

== Description and history ==
The Greenbanks Hollow Covered Bridge is located in a rural area of southern Danville, spanning Joes Brook, an east-flowing tributary of the Connecticut River. Greenbanks Hollow Road is a minor through road between Danville and Peacham. It is a single-span queen post truss structure, with flanking trusses of unequal length. The western truss is 73 feet (22 m) long, while the eastern one is 1.5 feet (0.46 m) longer, the skew visible at the southern portal. The bridge is 16.5 feet (5.0 m) wide, with a roadway width of 15 feet (4.6 m), carrying one lane of traffic. It is covered by a metal gabled roof with broad eaves. The side walls are covered to about half their height with vertical board siding, which is extended around the full height of the portals. The bridge rests on abutments of stone and concrete; the northern one has been rebuilt after its original stone abutment collapsed.

The bridge's construction date and builder are not known. Vermont historian Herbert Congdon claims that the bridge was originally uncovered, and that its roof is a later addition. It is stylistically similar to the bridges located in nearby Lyndon, which also feature queen post trusses, half-height siding, and broad roofs. It is the only surviving 19th-century covered bridge in the town of Danville. It was substantially rebuilt in 2002.

== See also ==
- List of covered bridges in Vermont
- National Register of Historic Places listings in Caledonia County, Vermont
- List of bridges on the National Register of Historic Places in Vermont
