= Mount Whittier =

Mount Whittier may refer to a mountain in the United States:

- Mount Whittier (New Hampshire)
  - Mount Whittier Ski Area, former ski resort
- Mount Whittier (Washington), near Mount St. Helens

== See also ==
- Whittier Peak, in the North Cascades of Washington
