= Barnet Center Historic District =

Historic district in Vermont, United States

- U.S. National Register of Historic Places
- U.S. Historic district
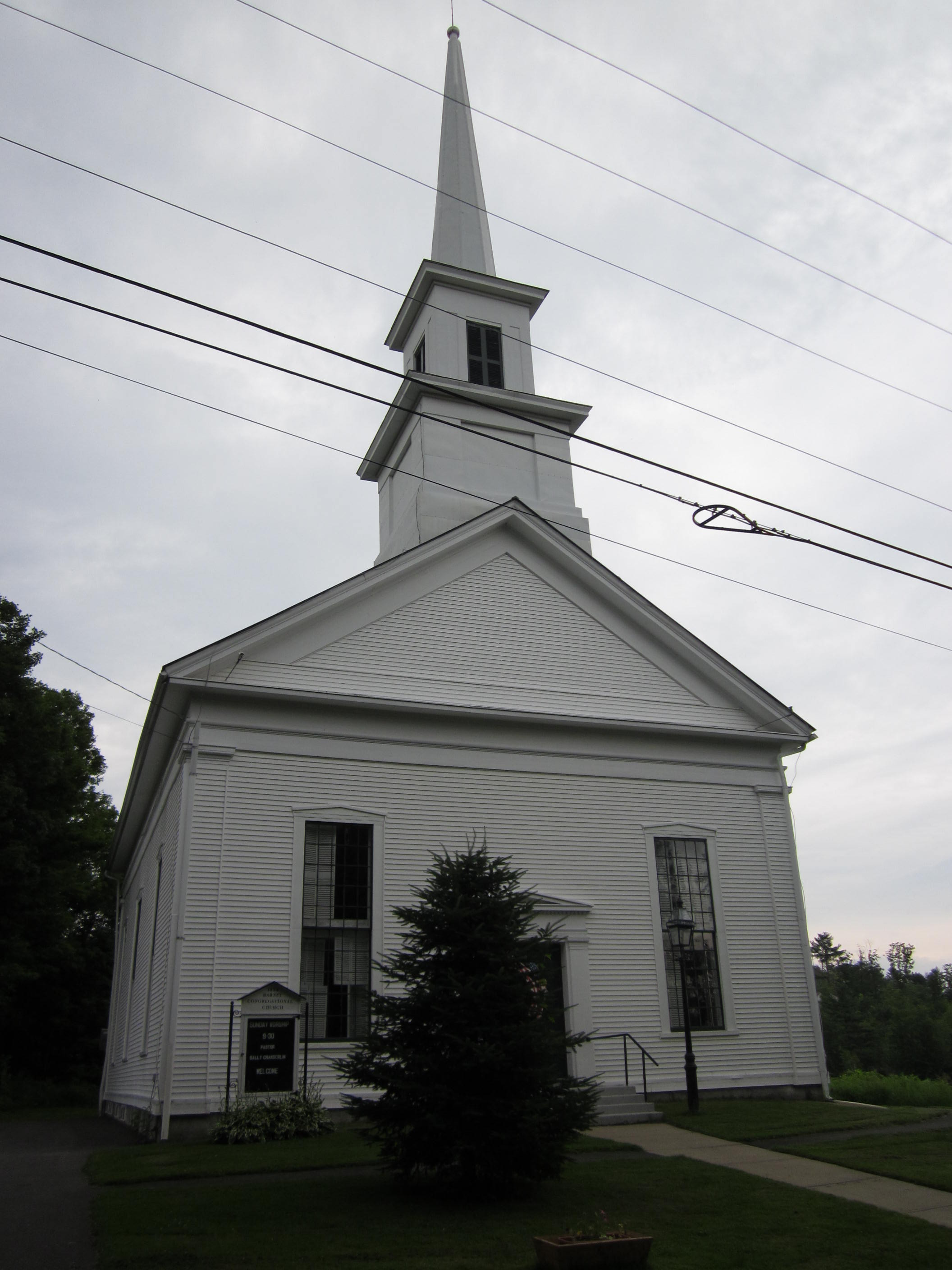

- Location within Vermont Location within the United States
- Location: Off US 5, Barnet, Vermont
- Coordinates: 44°18′44″N 72°5′9″W
- Area: 22 acres (8.9 ha)
- Architectural style: Greek Revival
- NRHP reference No.: 84003440
- Added to NRHP: July 12, 1984

The Barnet Center Historic District encompasses a small cluster of buildings and a cemetery, which make up the original town center of Barnet, Vermont. Located on Barnet Center Road, it includes the 1849 Presbyterian church, vestry, and two residences, built between 1790 and 1898, as well as the town's first cemetery and a c. 1915 toolshed. It was the first town in Vermont to be settled by direct immigration from Scotland. The district was listed on the National Register of Historic Places in 1984.

== Description and history ==
The town of Barnet was settled in the 1770s by a group of Scottish immigrants from Perth and Stirling. The first Presbyterian church was built near the town's geographic center on a rise above the Stevens River, and became the focal point for the town's civic life. That first building, started in 1787 and completed in 1800, was replaced by a brick church which burned in 1849. The present Greek Revival church was built on its site the same year. The cemetery was formally established in 1791, the same year that the Cape style house of Reverend David Goodwillie was completed. This house is the second-oldest surviving building in the town. About 1830, Rev. Thomas Goodwillie built the church parsonage, and in 1898 the church vestry was added. At the southern end of the cemetery, a small wood-frame building was added about 1915 to house tools and equipment.

The district is bounded on the south by the Stevens River and West Barnet Road, and on the west by Barnet Center Road. It extends north along the east side of Barnet Center Road to Town Highway 55, with the church roughly at its center, opposite Ferguson Road. It encompasses an area of about 22 acres (8.9 ha).

== See also ==
- National Register of Historic Places listings in Caledonia County, Vermont
