= East Hardwick, Vermont =

- Village
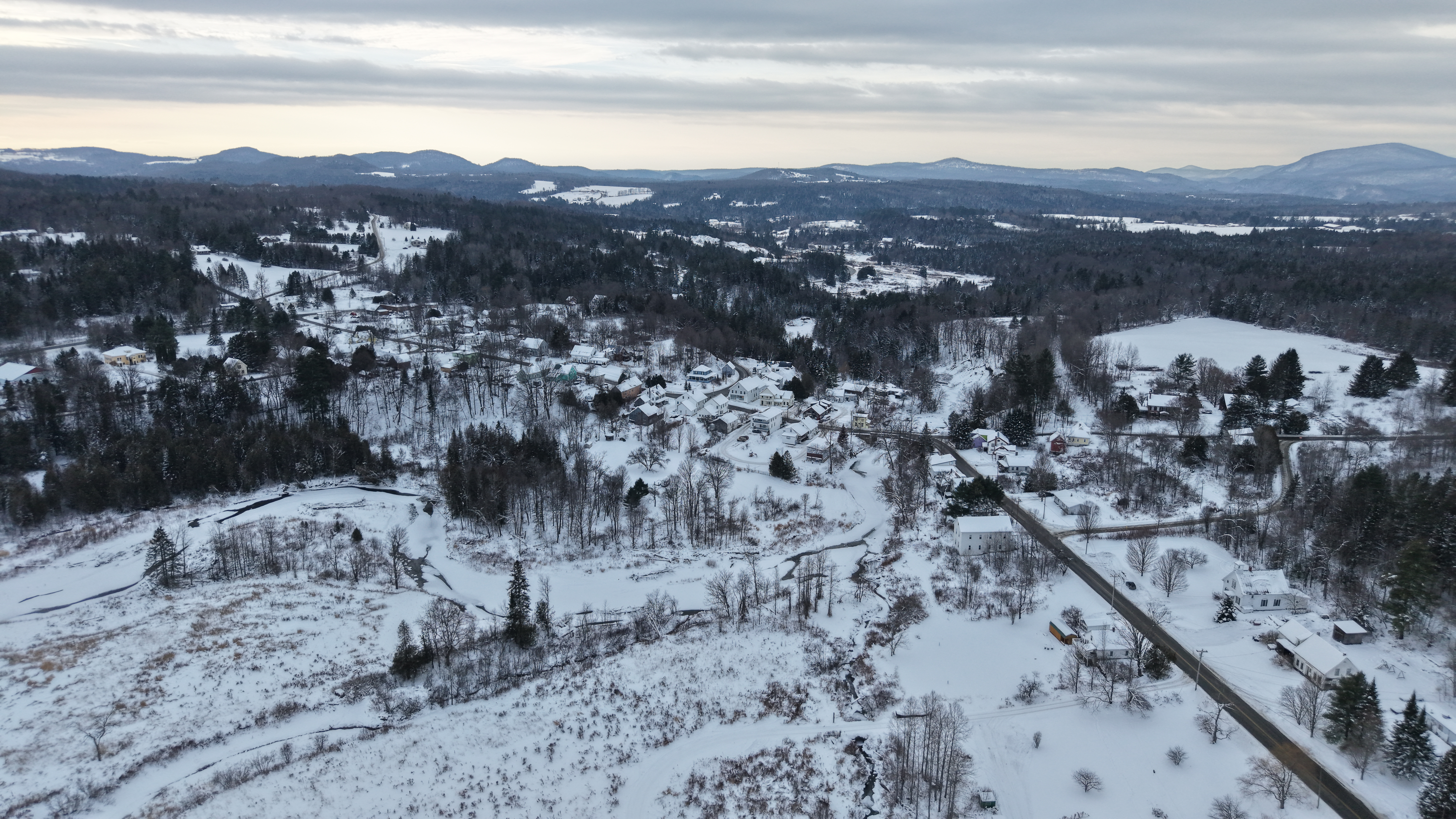
- East Hardwick, VT, from the northeast

- Location within Vermont
- Coordinates: 44°31′18″N 72°18′31″W
- Country: United States
- State: Vermont
- County: Caledonia
- Elevation: 1,083 ft (330 m)
- Time zone: UTC-5 (Eastern (EST))
  - Summer (DST): UTC-4 (EDT)
- ZIP code: 05836
- Area code: 802
- GNIS feature ID: 1457279

East Hardwick is an unincorporated village in the town of Hardwick, Vermont, United States. It is part of what is known as the Northeast Kingdom (NEK) of Vermont. The community is located on the Lamoille River and along Vermont Route 16, 16 miles (26 km) west-northwest of St. Johnsbury. East Hardwick has a post office with ZIP code 05836, which opened on October 10, 1810. According to a 1937 WPA Federal Writers Project Guidebook, East Hardwick is a "side hill village spilling from the level of a plateau down a sharp incline in the valley of the Lamoille. It is surrounded by rich farm lands, Maple groves and forests."

== History ==
The building of the Bayley-Hazen Military Road facilitated growth of this area of Vermont. General Bayley began this road in 1776 for the purposes of conveying troops and provisions into Canada. The project was abandoned but begun again in 1779.

In 1989 the Vermont Division for Historic Preservation completed a Historic Sites and Structures Survey of the village, designating an East Hardwick Historic District. Much of the following information is derived from the Statement of Significance and other portions of that document.

In 1797 Samuel Stevens (1775-1838, m. Puah Melon) came to the area. He was the first European settler of the village. By 1800 Stevens had erected a sawmill and a grist mill. The settlement was known as Stevens Mills or Stevensville. He was known as an intelligent and enterprising man who practiced temperance and exerted a moral influence on the village. By 1885 Stevensville was a thriving community, boasting two general stores, two churches, a carriage factory, a saw mill, a grist mill and several dwellings.

Previous to the Yankee settlements in Vermont, it is known that indigenous people lived in Vermont near Lake Champlain and the Connecticut River. No evidence of settlements has been discovered near East Hardwick Village, but it is certainly possible that indigenous peoples traveled along the Lamoille River, one of several rivers that allow east-west passage through the Green Mountains.

Also see: Bits of historical information relating to the history of East Hardwick Village. Presented in a timeline with other significant events for context. Compiled by C. Michaels with many thanks to Dr. Elizabeth Dow of the Hardwick Historical Society for her assistance and corrections. Published on the EHNO website. https://ehno5.wordpress.com/historic-pictures/

=== Architecture ===
The first period of East Hardwick's growth dates from approx. 1800 - 1850. During this time two Federal style houses and many Greek Revival residences and commercial structures were built along Main Street.

Greek Revival Style was the first of the Romantic Houses built in the United States, commonly between 1825 and 1860. They are characterized by a low pitched gabled or hipped roof emphasized with wide bands of trim. Commonly front of the house is in the gabled end. The front door is commonly surrounded by narrow sidelights and may have a rectangular line of transom lights or other trim above. Many have elaborate door surrounds and many layered entablature.

The second period of growth dates from 1870 to 1900. During this period building continued in the Greek Revival style, one structure with Gothic Revival influence and many with embellishments in the Italianate style. The Italianate Style features arched and curved window crowns, porches with elaborate supports, decorative cornices and two over two windows.

Several Colonial Revival buildings were erected at the turn of the century. Colonial Revival refers to the rebirth of interest in the early English and Dutch houses of the Atlantic seafaring towns and includes Georgian and Adams Styles.

By the 1880s most of the present structures in the village had been built. East Hardwick is fortunate to have retained a wealth of antique structures. Generally, these structures are well preserved. Some are at-risk but still retain many of their original features.

=== Railroads ===
Where the Lamoille River played an important part in the initial settlement of East Hardwick Village, the rail road played an important part in its continued growth.

The St. J. and L. C. railroad passed through East Hardwick Village where there was a station on Stevens Lane behind what is now East Church Street. The station no longer exists. The railroad began construction in December 1869 as part of the Vermont Division of the Portland and Ogdensburg Railway to connect the Great Lakes with the seaport of Portland, Maine. It would be completed on July 17, 1877 (3). By 1891 the St J. & L. C. trains going west to Rouses Point with connections to the Great Lakes, left East Hardwick Station at 8:55, 4:46 and 7:25 and trains going east left at 6:16, 10:58 and 8:00 for St. Johnsbury.

The section of rail that passed through East Hardwick is now part of the Vermont Rail Trail System and the Lamoille Valley Rail Trail (LVRT). At 93 miles long, the LVRT is the longest rail trail in New England and connects 18 towns from St. Johnsbury to Swanton. The LVRT is a four-season, multi-purpose recreation and transportation corridor for walking, hiking, cycling, horseback riding, snowshoeing, cross country skiing, dogsledding, and snowmobiling. No motorized vehicles are permitted in the summer season.

Today the brick house built by Samuel Stevens is a perennial garden center with an English tea garden where the owners serve lunch and afternoon tea on the lawn adjacent to the house and overlooking the river. The Lamoille Valley Rail Trail follows the river below the brick house and provides a path for those who want to walk, bike, ride a horse or snow shoe along the river.

The village is mostly a bedroom community and boasts a nursery school, an art gallery, a chiropractic office in the old school house, a gas station/market and an auto repair facility, as well as a few businesses along the highway. There is a small but active Congregational Church and a Grange Hall. Caledonia Grange #9 on Church Street is the oldest continuously operating Grange in New England. It is listed in the State Register of Historic Places and the National Register of Historic Places. The building also hosts summer concerts, meetings and educational workshops. Additionally, the community boasts a charming springtime children's parade and a fall harvest dinner at the Church.

At the corner of Main and School Streets there is a Women's Christian Temperance Union water tub. It is planted with flowers each spring by the women of the community, who retreat to a nearby porch for gin and tonic after this activity.

There is an active group of "villagers" who in 2019, under the name East Hardwick Neighborhood Organization, formed a Vermont non-profit corporation with 501(c)3 standing. The organization works to preserve historic structures and village history and improve community life. Current projects include developing a park along the Lamoille Valley Rail Trail, improving an overlook and parking area on the Lamoille River as well as sponsoring community events and advocating for improved sidewalks and traffic safety.

In 2018 the village was selected as a Designated Village Center by the Vermont Agency of Commerce and Community Development. This community revitalization program helps maintain or evolve small to medium-sized historic centers with existing civic and commercial buildings. The designation supports the historic center and offers training and financial incentives to bring additional public and private investment to spark village revitalization.

== Government ==
East Hardwick Village is part of the incorporated Town of Hardwick. The town is managed by a town manager and five member select board. The town holds an annual town meeting in March. The town has one elementary school (K-6). Grades 7-12 attend the Hazen Union School (Greensboro, Hardwick, Woodbury) which is located in Hardwick. Additional programs available within the district include the Green Mountain Technology and Career Center, Dual Enrollment, Early College and Pathways/Independent Study. The enrollment levels over the last ten years span from 314 students to 376 students.

East Hardwick was never an incorporated Village, but was established as a Vermont Fire District, also a municipal corporation. The East Hardwick Fire District no.1 (EHFD#1) was established in 1912. The Fire District had powers to collect taxes, post bonds, build sidewalks, build a reservoir and water lines, collect water rents, instal street lights and other community improvements. Today, most of those duties, including the collection of taxes, are the provenance of the town of Hardwick. The village of East Hardwick still maintains its own water system, managed by a board of trustees under the East Hardwick Fire District designation. The water system is fed by springs located 94 acres of pristine softwood forest. The water is stored in an underground reservoir and is gravity fed into the village.

Sanborn Cemetery is on Montgomery Hill in East Hardwick. Samuel Stevens, his wife Puah and many generations of East Hardwickians are buried there. The cemetery is owned by the town of Hardwick and managed by the town sexton.

East Hardwick does not have a sewage treatment plant; residences and businesses have private septic systems. The Hardwick Police Department and volunteer ambulance and the Hardwick Fire District service the village. Electricity is provided by the Hardwick Electric Department, a not for profit municipal utility. Comcast provides cable TV and internet services to the village.
