= Face to face with Christ my Saviour =

Hymn by Carrie Breck (1898)

Face to Face with Christ my Saviour is a hymn by American writer Carrie Breck, written in 1898. It is Breck's most well-known composition.

== Background ==
Carrie Breck wrote the hymn while living in Vineland, New Jersey, a temperance town founded by Charles K. Landis. It was first sung publicly in 1899 by Grant Tullar at First Presbyterian Church in Vineland. Tullar was a singer and evangelist who had co-founded a music publishing company with Isaac H. Meredith in 1893.

== Words ==
The hymn is based on 1 Corinthians 13:12, which describes how a Christian's relationship with Jesus will be transformed on his return: "Now we see through a glass, darkly; but then face to face: now I know in part; but then shall I know even as also I am known."

== Tune ==
The hymn has consistently been sung to a tune composed by Tullar, as originally sung in 1899. Tullar originally composed the music for a different set of words, during an evangelistic campaign in Rutherford, New Jersey. In his book Written Because, Tullar described how the composition had been inspired by an "almost-empty jelly dish":

My fondness for jelly was not long a secret and my hostess did her best to see that a reasonable supply was always on the table. The three of us had spent the afternoon calling on the sick, so we were a bit hurried in the preparation for supper that evening, and the jelly dish was neglected. It had only a wee dab of jelly in it, and as I passed it to the others, I possibly showed fear lest they should not refuse it. But host and hostess refused it, and as I started to help myself I said, “So this is all for me, is it?” At that instant, “all for me” as a theme for a song thrust itself upon my mind with such force that I placed the dish again on the table without taking any jelly, and excusing myself, went to the piano and wrote the melody and a few verses.

This newly composed hymn, with the opening line "All for me the Savior suffered", was sung at a service in the Methodist Episcopal Church later that evening, by the minister Charles L. Mead. Tullar intended to revise the words the following day. In the morning, however, he received a letter from Breck containing a few of her poems, requesting him to compose the musical accompaniment. One of these poems was "Face to face with Christ my Savior", the words of which fitted the music Tullar had already written. Discarding his own words, Tullar decided to pair his tune with Breck's text.

== Publication history ==
"Face to face with Christ my Savior" is Carrie Breck's best-known composition, which has appeared in many hymnals. It has mainly been sung in America, and is less known in the United Kingdom. It was first published in an 1899 anthology by Grant Tullar and Isaac H. Meredith, Sermons in Song, No. 2. It was later included in Breck's 1927 collection of poetry, To Comfort Thee, and Other Verses. In the 20th century, it was included in the Baptist Hymnal (1956, and subsequent editions), Hymns for the Living Church (1974), Seventh-day Adventist Hymnal (1985), and New Redemption Hymnal (1986), among others. In 1910, the hymn was also published in a German translation, "Aug in Auge vor ihm stehen", in Evangeliums-Sänger.
