= Temperance Town =

Temperance Town may refer to:

- Temperance Towns, settlements founded by followers of the Temperance movement.
- Temperance Town, Cardiff, the name of one such settlement.
