= Samuel S. Jones Cobblestone House =

Historic house in Wisconsin, United States

- Jones, Samuel S., Cobblestone House
- U.S. National Register of Historic Places
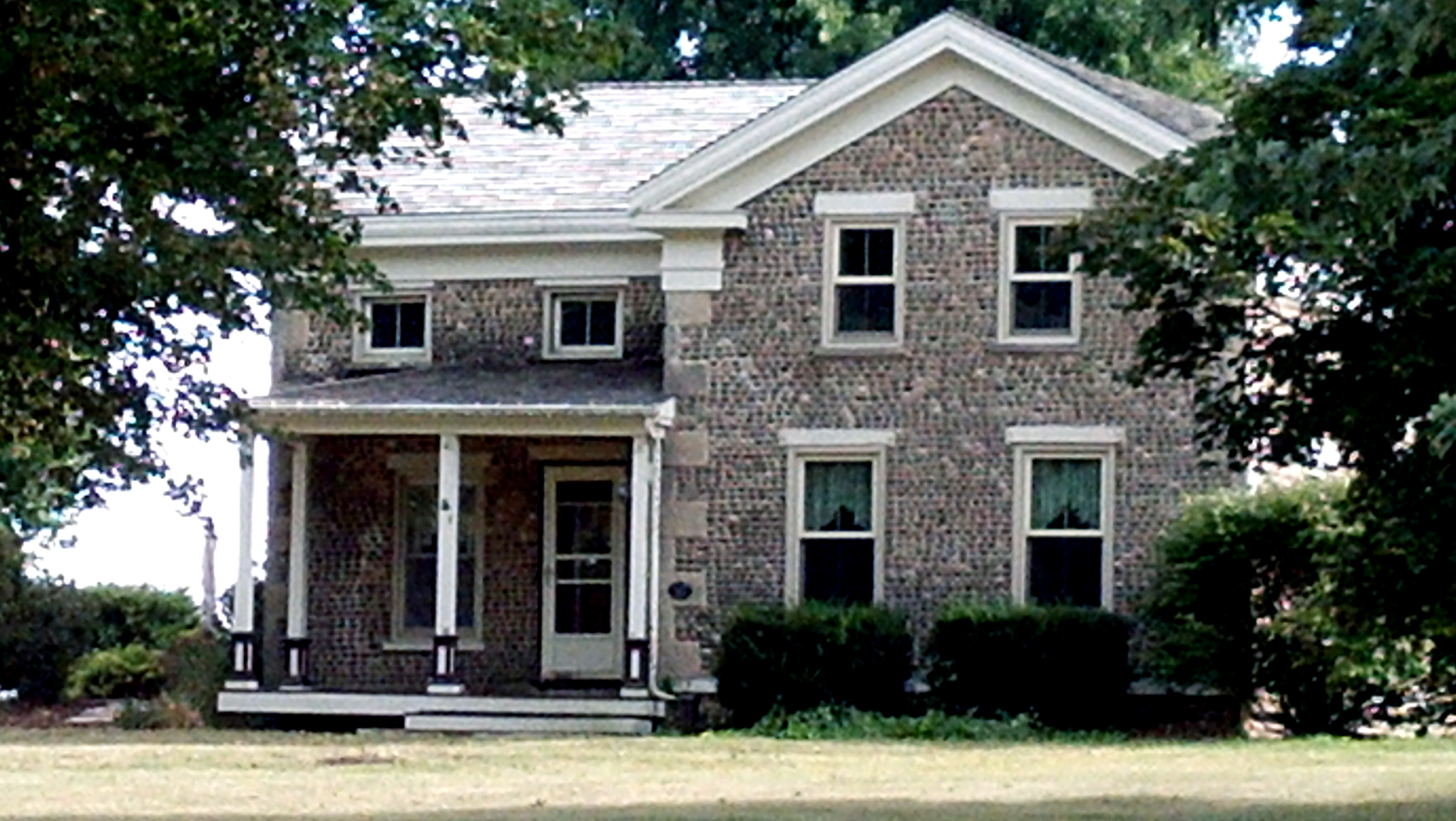
- Samuel S. Jones Cobblestone House
- Location: Clinton, Wisconsin
- Coordinates: 42°33′57″N 88°49′02″W
- Area: 0.6 acres (0.24 ha)
- Built: 1847
- Architectural style: Greek Revival
- MPS: Cobblestone Buildings of Rock County TR (AD)
- NRHP reference No.: 78000133
- Added to NRHP: February 23, 1978

The Samuel S. Jones Cobblestone House is a large Greek Revival-styled farmhouse built in Clinton, Wisconsin in the late 1840s. The house was listed on the National Register of Historic Places in 1978 and on the State Register of Historic Places in 1989.

== History ==
The land on which the house sits was acquired by a Jerome Yates from the U.S. government in 1840, then sold the following year to Wesley Cary. Cary probably constructed buildings, but it's unclear if he built the surviving cobblestone house or if Samuel S. Jones built the house in 1849, after he bought the property. Jones was a New Yorker who settled on this farm after marrying Margaret Richardson.

Regardless of who built the house, its Greek Revival style was common for stylish houses in the 1840s. Identifying features of the style are the low-pitched roof, the cornice returns, the frieze board beneath the eaves, and the simple straight lintels above the windows. Less common in Greek Revival residences are the two wings and the cobblestone exterior. Between limestone quoins on the corners, the cobblestones are set in horizontal courses. The cobbles on the front of the house are carefully matched for size and color. Stones on the sides and back are more varied. Parts of the south and west walls were covered with stucco in the early 1900s, but this is of historical interest, since it was common in the Clinton area at that time.

Jones' youngest son Samuel S. Jones took over the farm. and became a member of the Wisconsin State Assembly. After him, his daughter Rachel and husband Clayton Storey farmed there. The farm was sold outside the family in the 1920s.

As of 1977 the house was the largest of thirteen cobblestone houses remaining in Rock county.
