= Carrie Breck =

American poet and hymn writer (1855–1934)

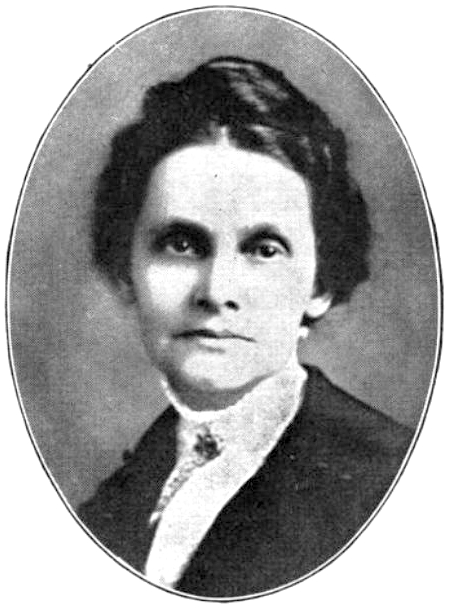
Portrait of Carrie Breck

Carrie Elizabeth Breck (née Ellis; January 22, 1855 – March 27, 1934) was an American poet and hymnwriter, best known for the hymn "Face to face with Christ my Saviour".

== Life ==
Carrie Elizabeth Ellis was born on January 22, 1855 in Walden, Vermont, to Stephen Thompson Ellis (1827–1901) and Elizabeth Naomi Boynton Cobern Ellis (1833–1911). She was the second of their seven children. In December 1863, the family moved to Vineland, New Jersey, a newly established temperance town founded by Charles K. Landis. She trained as a teacher at Bridgewater State Normal School.

On May 28, 1884, Ellis married Frank A. Breck (1860–1936), who was involved in fruit juice production in Vineland. The couple lived on Landis Avenue, the main road in Vineland, and were members of First Presbyterian Church. In 1914, they moved to Portland, Oregon, where Frank Breck worked as head of the Breck Fruit Juice company. The couple had five daughters. One of these, Flora Elizabeth Breck (1886–1962), wrote several books for choir directors and Sunday School teachers.

== Poetry and hymn writing ==
Carrie Breck wrote over 1400 poems, some of which were used as hymn texts. She sometimes used the name Mrs Frank A. Breck for her writing. Describing her own approach to writing, she said: "I penciled verse under all sorts of conditions—over a mending basket, with a baby in arms, and sometimes even when sweeping or washing dishes, my mind moved to meter." On another occasion, she wrote: "For more than forty years, I have had the habit of verse-writing, in such intervals of time as the life of a busy mother and housewife afforded."

Carrie Breck's first published hymn was "Something for Jesus", which appeared in the Christian Herald in February 1893. The opening stanza read:

You ought to do something for Jesus—
You ought to do something today;
If you can give help to the needy,
Why should you one moment delay?

In 1927, she published a collection of 199 poems, entitled To Comfort Thee, and Other Verses.

Her best-known hymns include "Face to face with Christ my Savior", "I have such a wonderful Savior", "Jesus comes with power to gladden" and "Ev'ry prayer will find its answer".
