= William H. Boole =

William H. Boole (1827 – February 24, 1896) was a pastor of the Willet Street Methodist Church in the Bowery neighborhood of Manhattan in New York City.

== Biography ==
He was the son of John Boole and Magdalene Jane (Ackerman) Boole, and he had a brother Francis John Ackerman Boole who ran unsuccessfully for Mayor of New York City. William married Eunice Goodwin around 1843. He ran in the New York state election, 1882 on the Prohibition Party ticket for Lieutenant Governor of New York. He declined a nomination in 1883.

Boole married Ella Alexander on July 3, 1883. He was a trustee and juryman for Prohibition Park on Staten Island, now turned into the Westerleigh neighborhood. He died on February 24, 1896, at his home in Prohibition Park.
