= John L. Edwards =

American attorney and politician from Vermont

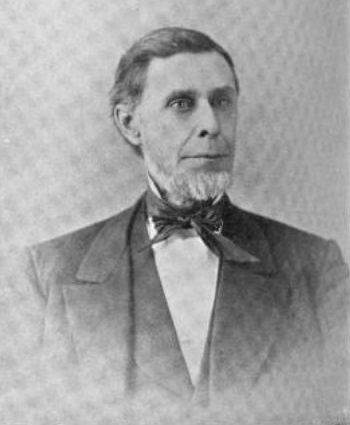
- From the November 1896 issue of The Vermonter magazine

State's Attorney of Orleans County, Vermont
- In office 1849–1850
- Preceded by: Henry F. Prentiss
- Succeeded by: Norman Boardman

Personal details
- Born: August 27, 1819; Walden, Vermont, U.S.
- Died: October 19, 1895 (aged 76); Walden, Vermont, U.S.
- Resting place: East Main Street Cemetery, Newport, Vermont, U.S.
- Political party: Whig (before 1856); Democratic (from 1856)
- Spouse: Elizabeth C. Brigham (m. 1847)
- Children: 1
- Education: University of Vermont (attended)
- Profession: Attorney

John L. Edwards (August 27, 1819 – October 19, 1895) was a Vermont attorney and politician. A Democrat during the more than 100 years when Republicans won every statewide election, he was the Democratic nominee for governor of Vermont in 1867 and 1868. In addition, he was a successful candidate for the United States House of Representatives in 1874 and 1876.

== Early life ==
John Lindsley Edwards (Note: Some sources give Edwards' middle name as "Lindsey.") was born in Walden, Vermont on August 27, 1819, the eleventh of thirteen children born to Timothy Edwards and Nancy (Gilman) Edwards. He was raised on the family farm in Walden and attended the local schools, followed by attendance at Newbury Seminary in Newbury, Vermont and New Hampton School in New Hampton, New Hampshire.

Edwards attended the University of Vermont (UVM) from 1840 to 1841, then decided to leave college and prepare for a career as an attorney. (Note: In 1885, UVM awarded Edwards the honorary degree of Master of Arts.) He studied law in the Derby office of Stoddard B. Colby for two years. Edwards was admitted to the bar in June 1843 and began to practice in Brownington.

== Start of career ==
In January 1844, Edwards moved to Barton, and in October 1845, he relocated first to Derby, and later to Newport. In Newport, he practiced as the partner of William M. Dickerman in the firm of Edwards & Dickerman until 1847, when he established a solo practice. In the fall of 1857 he went into partnership with Edward A. Stewart as Edwards & Stewart. While residing in Derby, Edwards was a leader of the effort to construct a new building for Derby Academy. In 1858, he became the partner of Samuel W. Slade of St. Johnsbury. In 1864, Edwards joined Jerry E. Dickerman of Newport and they used the Edwards & Dickerman name for their partnership.

In addition to practicing law, Edwards became active in politics as a Whig, and he served as State's Attorney of Orleans County from 1849 to 1850. In 1850, he was a delegate to the Vermont constitutional convention. After the demise of the Whigs in 1856, Edwards joined the Democratic Party, and he was a delegate to the 1857 state constitutional convention. In 1862, Edwards was a member of the Vermont Council of Censors, the body that met once every seven years to review laws passed by the Vermont General Assembly to ensure their constitutionality. He was an unsuccessful candidate to represent Orleans County in the Vermont Senate on several occasions, including 1863, 1878, 1882, and 1884.

== Continued career ==
As a Democrat during the post-American Civil War period when Republicans won every statewide election in Vermont, Edwards was the party's unsuccessful nominee for governor of Vermont in 1867, and lost to Republican John B. Page. He was also the unsuccessful Democratic nominee for governor in 1868, and again lost to Page. In 1872, Edwards was appointed a federal register in bankruptcy, and he held this post until his death. In the 1890s, Edwards also served as a commissioner for the United States District Court for the District of Vermont.

In 1874, he was the unsuccessful Democratic nominee for Vermont's 3rd district seat in the United States House of Representatives, and lost to incumbent George W. Hendee. He was again the unsuccessful Democratic nominee in 1876, and was again defeated by Hendee. When J. E. Dickerman became the U.S. Collector of Customs for Newport, he appointed Edwards as his deputy. In addition to his collector's post, Edwards was a member of the board of directors of the Newport National Bank. In 1878, Edwards was a founder of the Vermont Bar Association and he served as one the organization's vice presidents.

== Personal life ==
Edwards experienced a stroke while visiting his family's farm in Walden on August 27, 1895. He was left partially paralyzed and remained at the farm until his death on October 18, 1895. Edwards was buried at East Main Street Cemetery in Newport.

In December 1847, Edwards married Elizabeth C. Brigham of Brownington. They were the parents of one child, Nellie L. Dorman, whom they adopted when she eight years old.
