= Hardwick, Vermont =

- Town
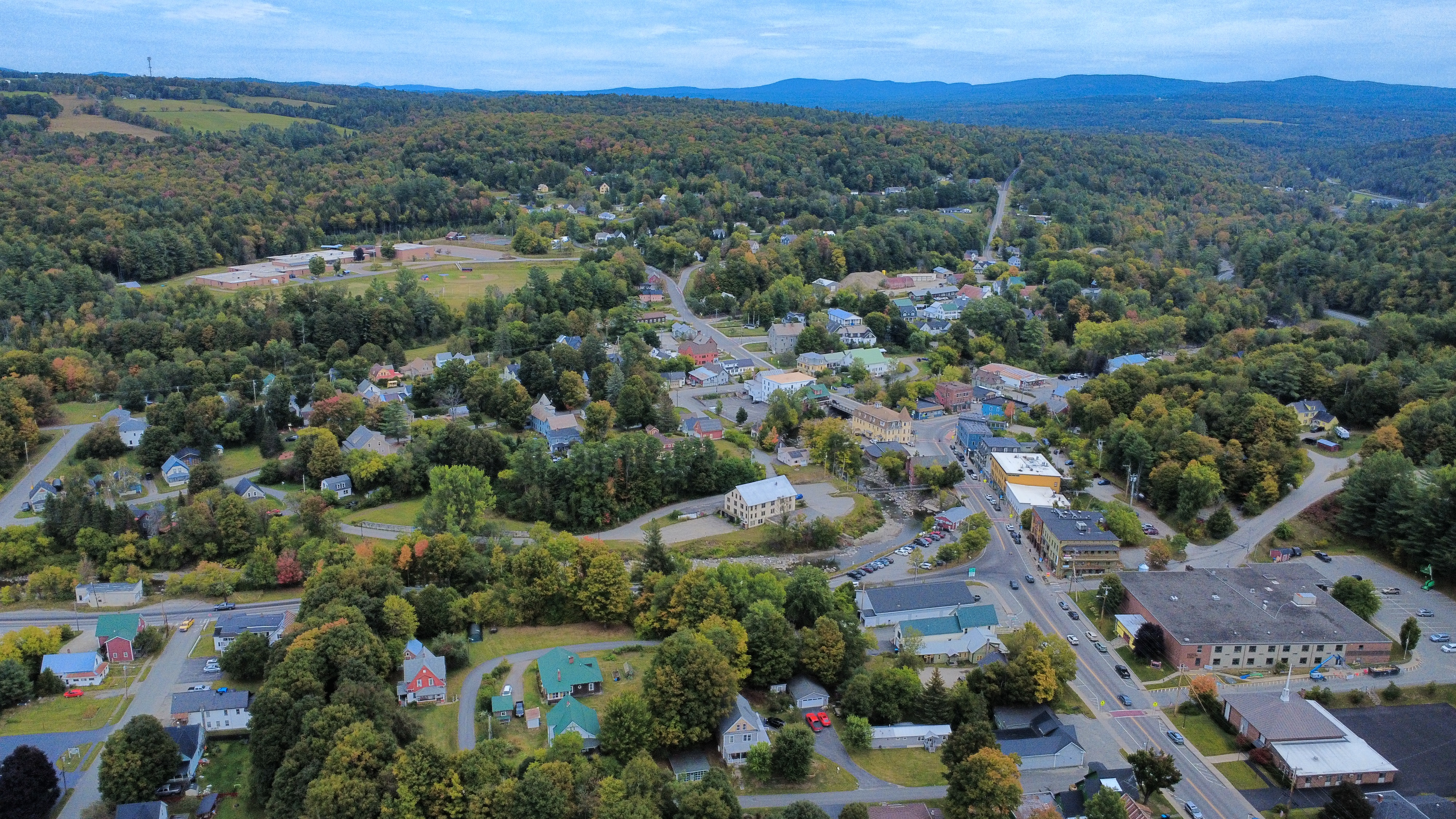
- Hardwick, from the west

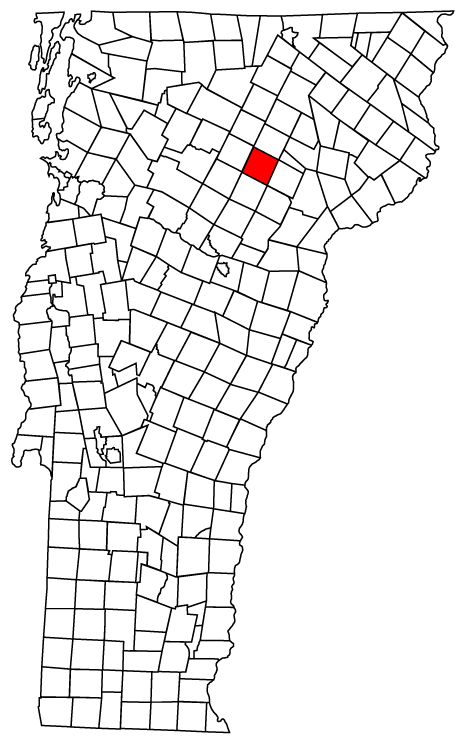
- Hardwick, Vermont
- Coordinates: 44°30′25″N 72°22′35″W
- Country: United States
- State: Vermont
- County: Caledonia
- Chartered: 1781
- Communities: Hardwick; East Hardwick; Hardwick Center; Hardwick Street; Mackville

Area
  - Total: 39.0 sq mi (101.1 km^{2})
  - Land: 38.6 sq mi (100.0 km^{2})
  - Water: 0.39 sq mi (1.0 km^{2})
- Elevation: 1,286 ft (392 m)

Population (2020)
  - Total: 2,920
  - Density: 76/sq mi (29.2/km^{2})
- Time zone: UTC-5 (Eastern (EST))
  - Summer (DST): UTC-4 (EDT)
- ZIP Codes: 05843 (Hardwick); 05836 (East Hardwick)
- Area code: 802
- FIPS code: 50-31825
- GNIS feature ID: 1462115
- Website: hardwickvt.gov

Hardwick is a town in Caledonia County, Vermont, United States. The population was 2,920 at the 2020 census. It contains the unincorporated villages of Hardwick, East Hardwick, and Mackville. The town is a commercial center for the region's farming population.

The main settlement of Hardwick in the center of the town, formerly an incorporated village, is since 1988 a census-designated place (CDP), with a population of 1,269 at the 2020 census.

== History ==
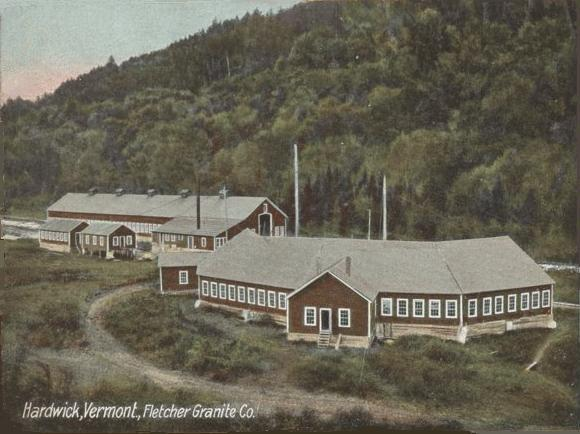
Fletcher Granite Co. c. 1907

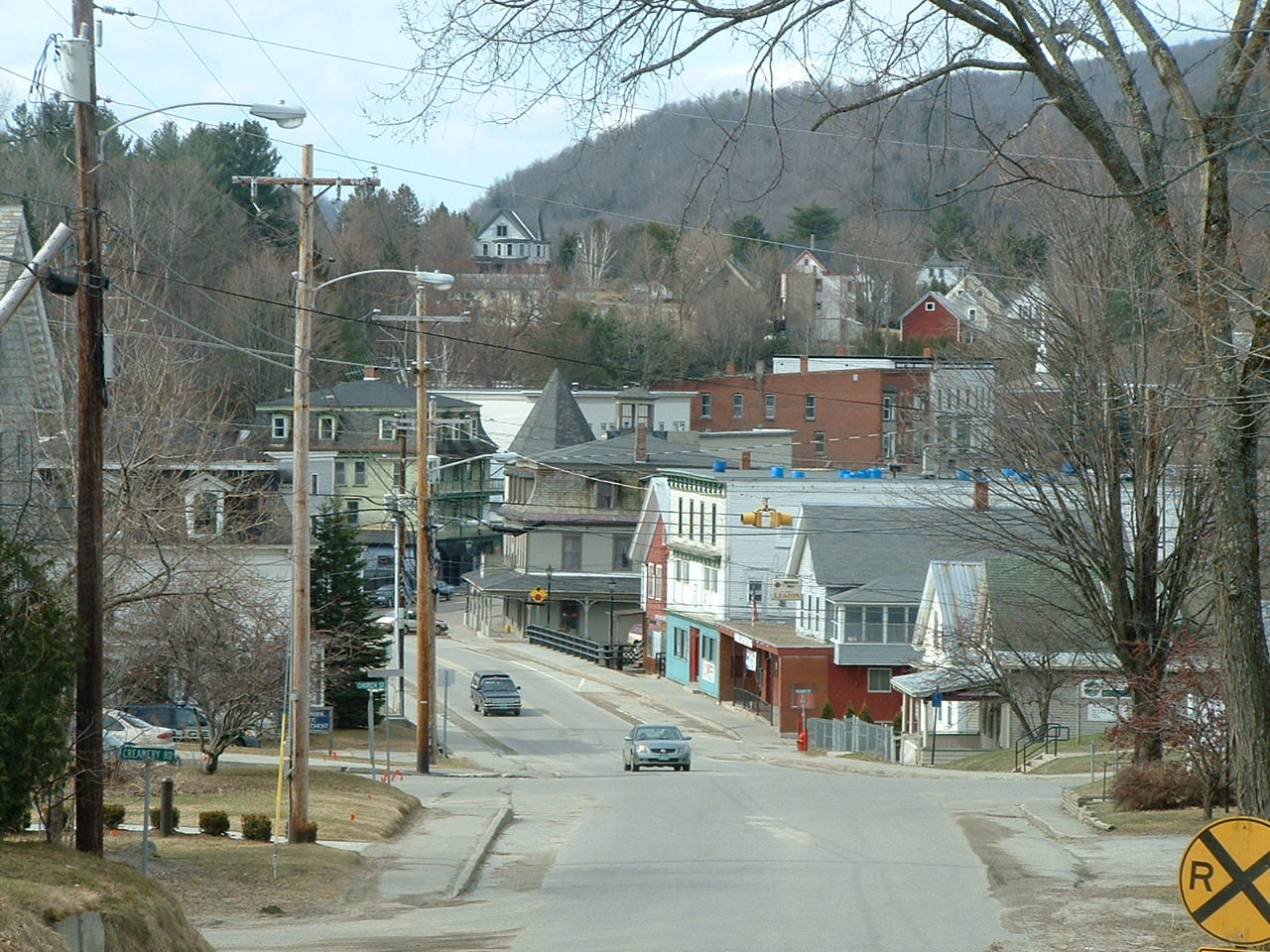
North Main Street

During the Revolutionary War, General George Washington ordered construction of the Bayley-Hazen Military Road to provide access into the interior of Vermont. It would prompt the development and settlement of Hardwick and East Hardwick.

The land that became the town was granted by the Vermont General Assembly on November 7, 1780, and the town was chartered on August 19, 1781, to Danforth Keyes and 66 others, some of whom were from Hardwick, Massachusetts. Permanent settlement began in 1793 when several families named Norris arrived from New Hampshire. By 1859, when the population reached 1,402, the town had several sawmills and gristmills on the Lamoille River. There were also two tanneries. Over the years, other industries would include a woolen mill, tinware shop, and carriage factory.

The predominant business following the Civil War was granite quarrying, especially after the Portland & Ogdensburg Railway opened service through the town and facilitated shipment of stone. While most of the granite was quarried in nearby Woodbury, the stone was dressed and finished in Hardwick, largely near "Granite Junction", where the rail lines met. The Hardwick and Woodbury Railroad was built to bring granite from the quarries to the finishing shops, and Hardwick became known as the "Building Granite Center of the World". By 1906, 1,200 people were employed in the industry, which was led by the Woodbury Granite Company. Buildings around the country made with Hardwick granite include the Pennsylvania State Capitol, Chicago City Hall, and the 1914 Post Office in Washington, D.C., as well as numerous city halls and custom houses. The decline of the "architectural granite" industry in the 1920s and 1930s left Hardwick in economic depression.

Hardwick Village disincorporated in 1988 and merged with the town.

== Geography ==
Hardwick is the westernmost town in Caledonia County. It is bordered by the Caledonia County towns of Walden and Stannard to the east. The town of Greensboro, in Orleans County, is to the north. Lamoille County is to the west, including the town of Wolcott to Hardwick's west and Elmore to the southwest. To the south, in Washington County, are the towns of Woodbury and Cabot. According to the United States Census Bureau, Hardwick has a total area of 39.0 square miles (101.1 km^{2}), of which 38.6 square miles (100.0 km^{2}) is land and 0.39 square miles (1.0 km^{2}), or 1.02%, is water. The CDP (town center) of Hardwick has a total area of 1.46 square miles (3.77 km^{2}), of which 1.44 square miles (3.73 km^{2}) is land and 0.015 square miles (0.04 km^{2}), or 1.16%, is water.

Hardwick is drained by the Lamoille River and its tributaries, flowing west to Lake Champlain. The highest point in Hardwick is the summit of Jeudevine Mountain in the northern corner of the town, at 1,831 feet (558 m) above sea level.

The town is crossed by Vermont Route 14, Vermont Route 15, and Vermont Route 16.

== Demographics ==
Historical population
Census	Pop.	Note	%±
1790	3		—
1800	260		8,566.7%
1810	735		182.7%
1820	867		18.0%
1830	1,216		40.3%
1840	1,354		11.3%
1850	1,402		3.5%
1860	1,369		−2.4%
1870	1,519		11.0%
1880	1,484		−2.3%
1890	1,547		4.2%
1900	2,466		59.4%
1910	3,201		29.8%
1920	2,641		−17.5%
1930	2,720		3.0%
1940	2,605		−4.2%
1950	2,629		0.9%
1960	2,349		−10.7%
1970	2,466		5.0%
1980	2,613		6.0%
1990	2,964		13.4%
2000	3,174		7.1%
2010	3,010		−5.2%
2020	2,920		−3.0%
U.S. Decennial Census

As of the census of 2000, there were 3,174 people, 1,216 households, and 854 families residing in the town. The population density was 82.4 people per square mile (31.8/km^{2}). There were 1,407 housing units at an average density of 36.5 per square mile (14.1/km^{2}). The racial makeup of the town was 97.89% White, 0.06% African American, 0.82% Native American, 0.09% Asian, 0.19% from other races, and 0.95% from two or more races. Hispanic or Latino of any race were 0.41% of the population.

There were 1,216 households, out of which 37.8% had children under the age of 18 living with them, 52.1% were married couples living together, 13.7% had a female householder with no husband present, and 29.7% were non-families. Of all households, 22.5% were made up of individuals, and 9.0% had someone living alone who was 65 years of age or older. The average household size was 2.61 and the average family size was 3.06.

In the town, the population was spread out, with 29.5% under the age of 18, 7.0% from 18 to 24, 28.9% from 25 to 44, 22.7% from 45 to 64, and 11.9% who were 65 years of age or older. The median age was 36 years. For every 100 females, there were 92.9 males. For every 100 females age 18 and over, there were 89.3 males.

== Economy ==
=== Personal income ===
The median income for a household in the town was $33,636, and the median income for a family was $39,278. Males had a median income of $27,188 versus $21,732 for females. The per capita income for the town was $14,813. About 10.5% of families and 14.0% of the population were below the poverty line, including 16.3% of those under age 18 and 14.2% of those age 65 or over.

=== Agriculture ===
Several agricultural businesses active in and around Hardwick, employing techniques of sustainable agriculture, have added an estimated 75-100 jobs to the area (through 2008). They operate the Vermont Food Venture Center, a "shared-use kitchen incubator for value-added and specialty food producers." The facility should generate the equivalent of 16 full-time jobs when fully operational.

== Historic places ==
The town contains five places on the National Register of Historic Places:

- Building at 143 Highland Avenue – 143 Highland Ave. (added May 6, 2000)
- Cobb School – Jct. of Hardwick Town Hwy. 10 (Cobb School Rd.) and Sanborn Cemetery Rd. (added October 30, 1993)
- Downtown Hardwick Village Historic District – Brush St. (added April 10, 2004)
- Downtown Hardwick Village Historic District – Main, Church, Maple and Mill Sts. (added October 30, 1982)
- Hardwick Street Historic District – NE of Hardwick (added July 22, 1979)

== Government ==
The federal government granted the town $492,000 in 2008 to upgrade the water system for fire-fighting purposes after a 2005 fire gutted the Bemis block.

The town owns the Hardwick Electric Department.

The town owns 225 feet (69 m) of shoreline on Caspian Lake in Greensboro. The 2.4 acres (0.97 ha) has been used for recreation since 1927. As a result, they pay taxes to Greensboro on land worth $644,000. This was overlooked until 2012. The Vermont State Legislature passed a bill near the end of its 2013 calendar exempting Caspian Lake Public Beach from state taxes, a bill which "appears to solve recent questions between Greensboro and Hardwick regarding taxation of the Public Beach."

== Media ==
The Hardwick Gazette is a weekly newspaper founded in 1889 that serves Hardwick and nine nearby communities. As of 2016 it has a circulation of about 2,200 and was for sale through an essay contest. While the contest did not receive enough entries, a buyer was found from among the entrants and ownership changed in February 2017. The buyer was Ray Smalls. Smalls has a background in business and bought the paper with his wife, putting his retirement plans on hold. Smalls was not able to gain as much success in improving circulation of the paper as he had hoped and has been personally financially supporting the paper for about three years.

== Notable people ==
- Guy W. Bailey, Secretary of State of Vermont and President of the University of Vermont
- Dustin Grow Cheever, politician
- Catherine Cate Coblentz, writer
- Philip Cummings, Spanish teacher, news analyst, public speaker
- Dorman Bridgman Eaton, lawyer and author
- Lee E. Emerson, 69th governor of Vermont
- Jim Fixx, author and jogging enthusiast
- Thomas J. D. Fuller, US congressman
- David H. Nichols, politician
- Kent Osborne, screenwriter and actor
- William H. Taylor, Associate Justice of the Vermont Supreme Court
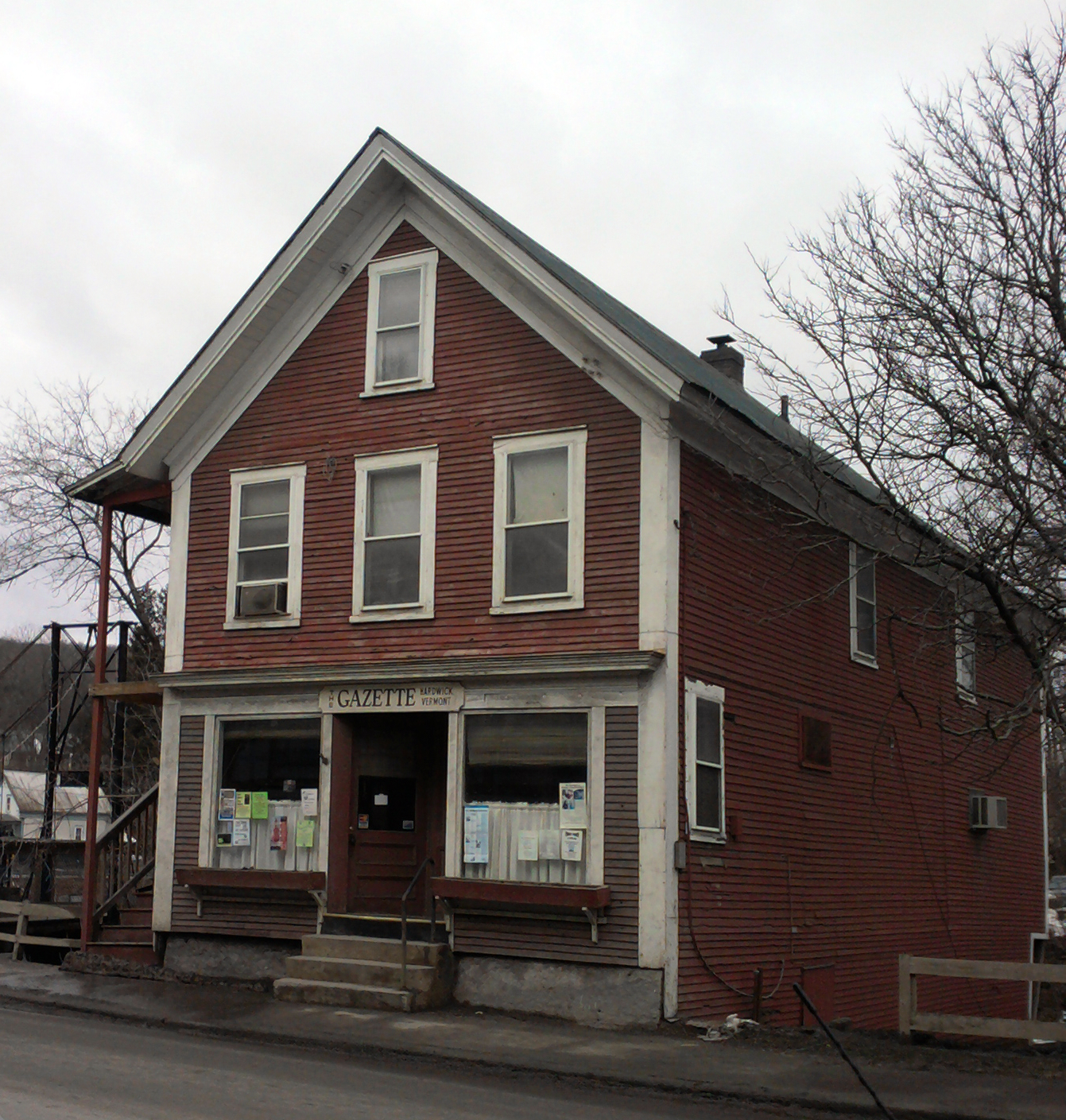
Hardwick Gazette building, 42 South Main Street

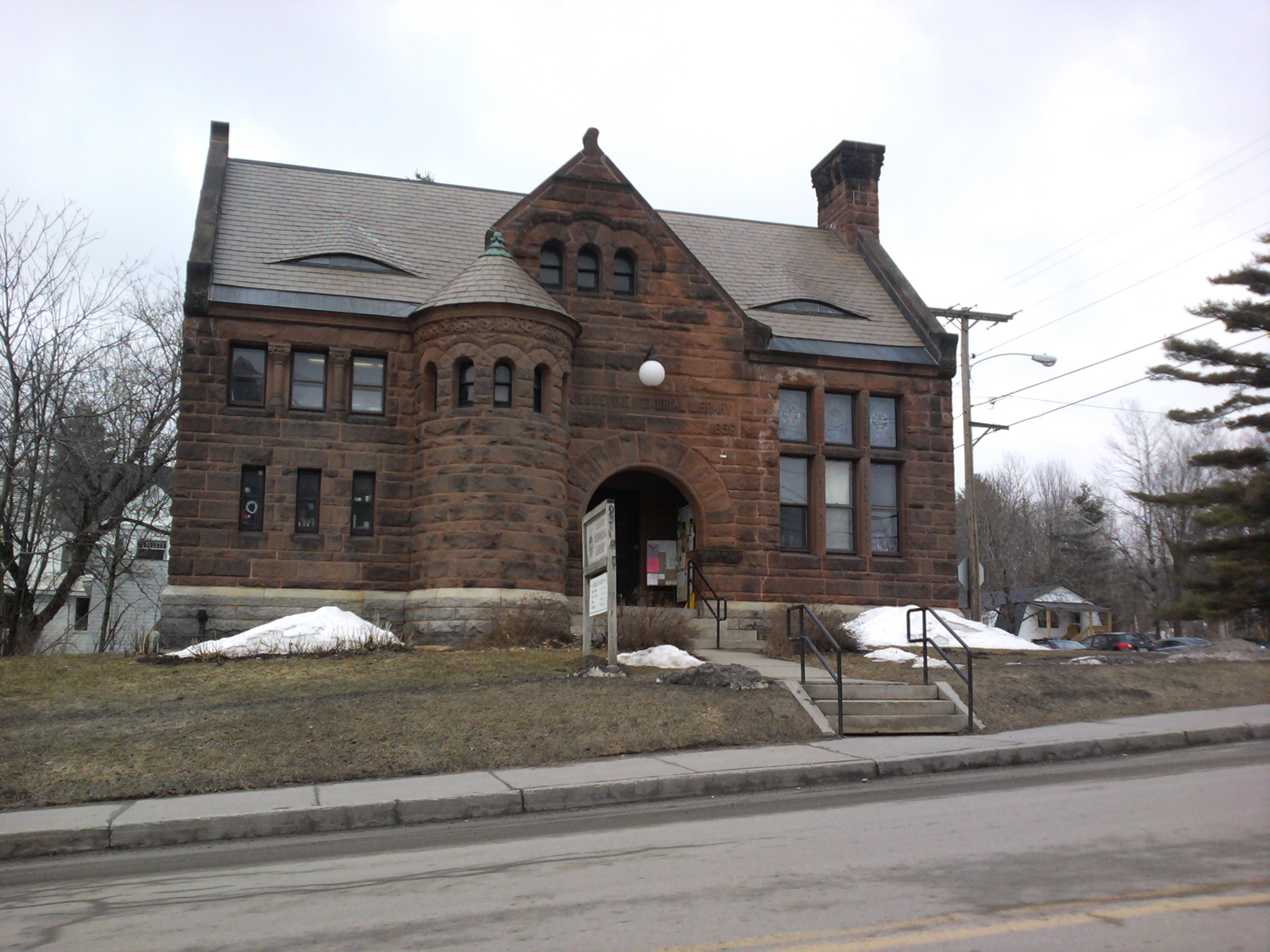
Jeudevine Library, 93 North Main Street

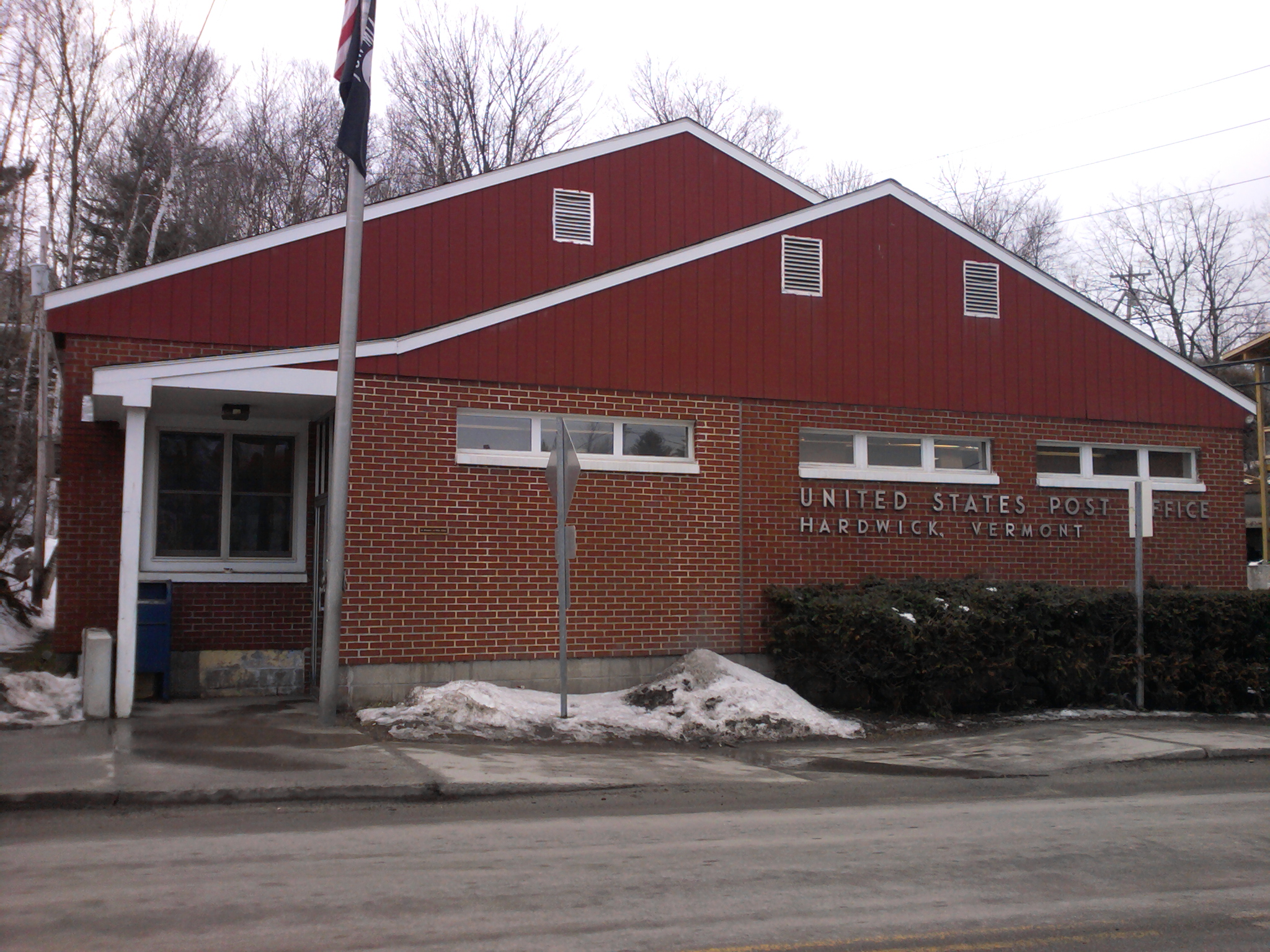
Hardwick Post Office, 52 Mill Street

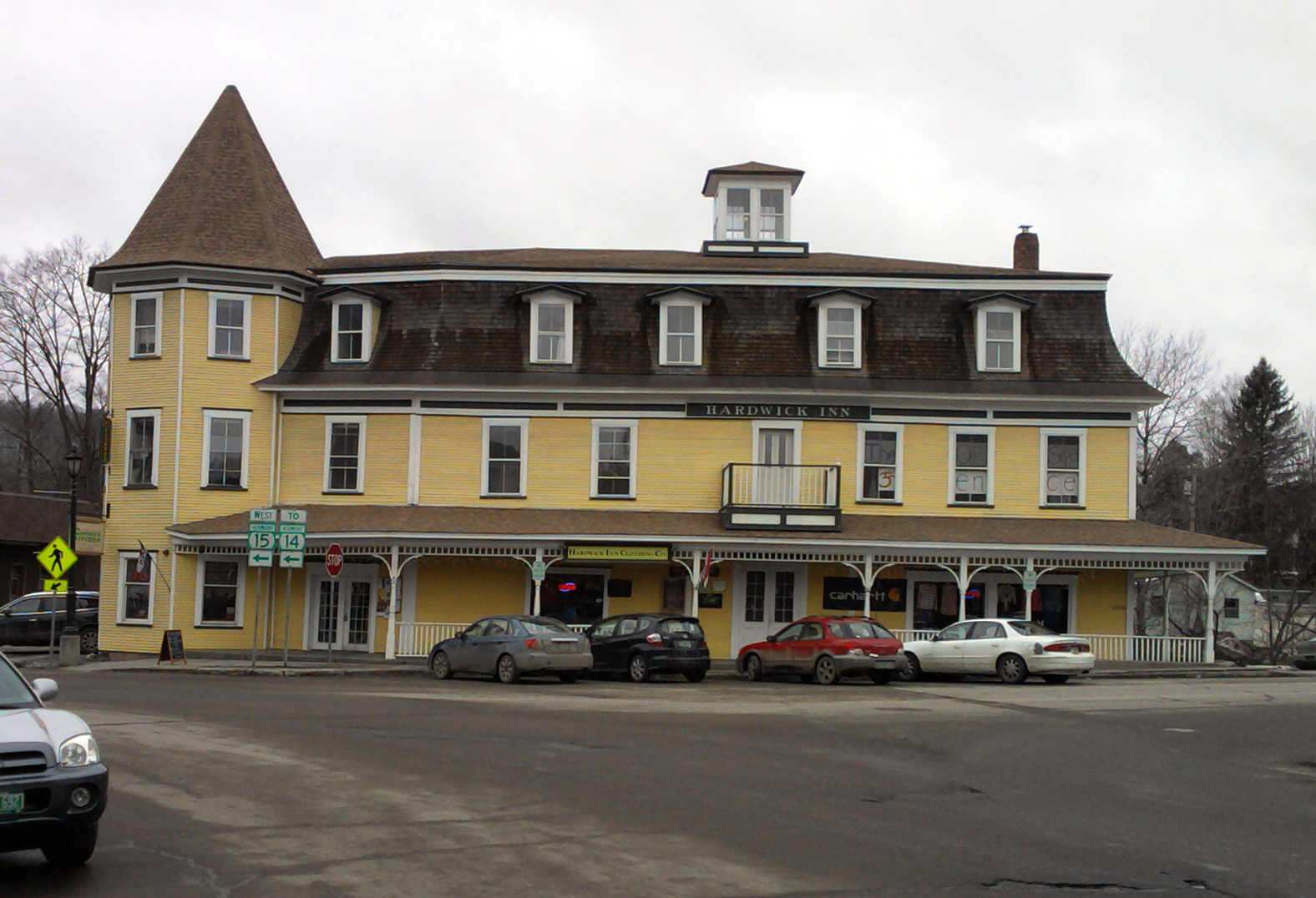
Historic Hardwick Inn, 4 South Main Street

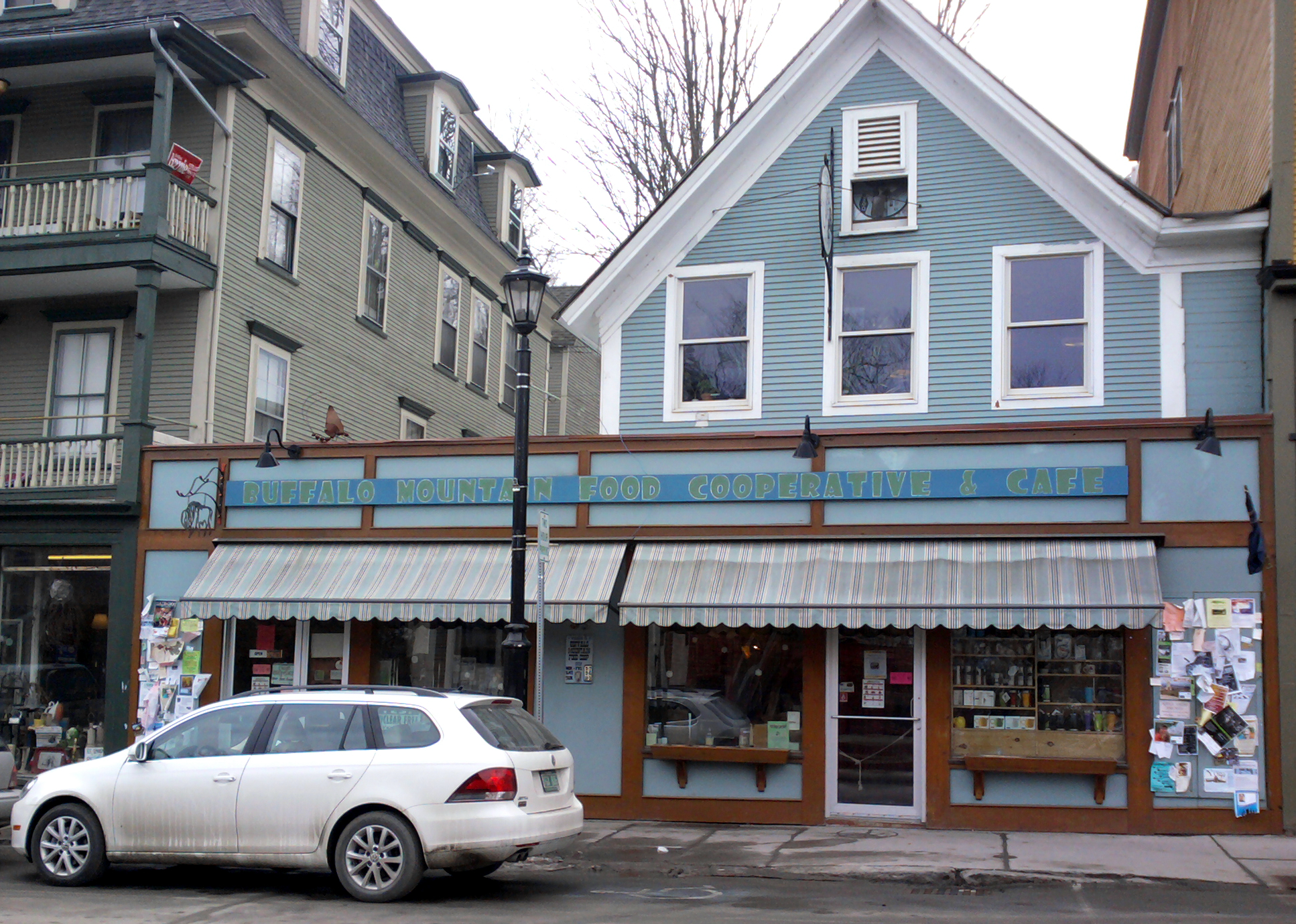
Buffalo Mountain Food Co-operative, 39 South Main Street

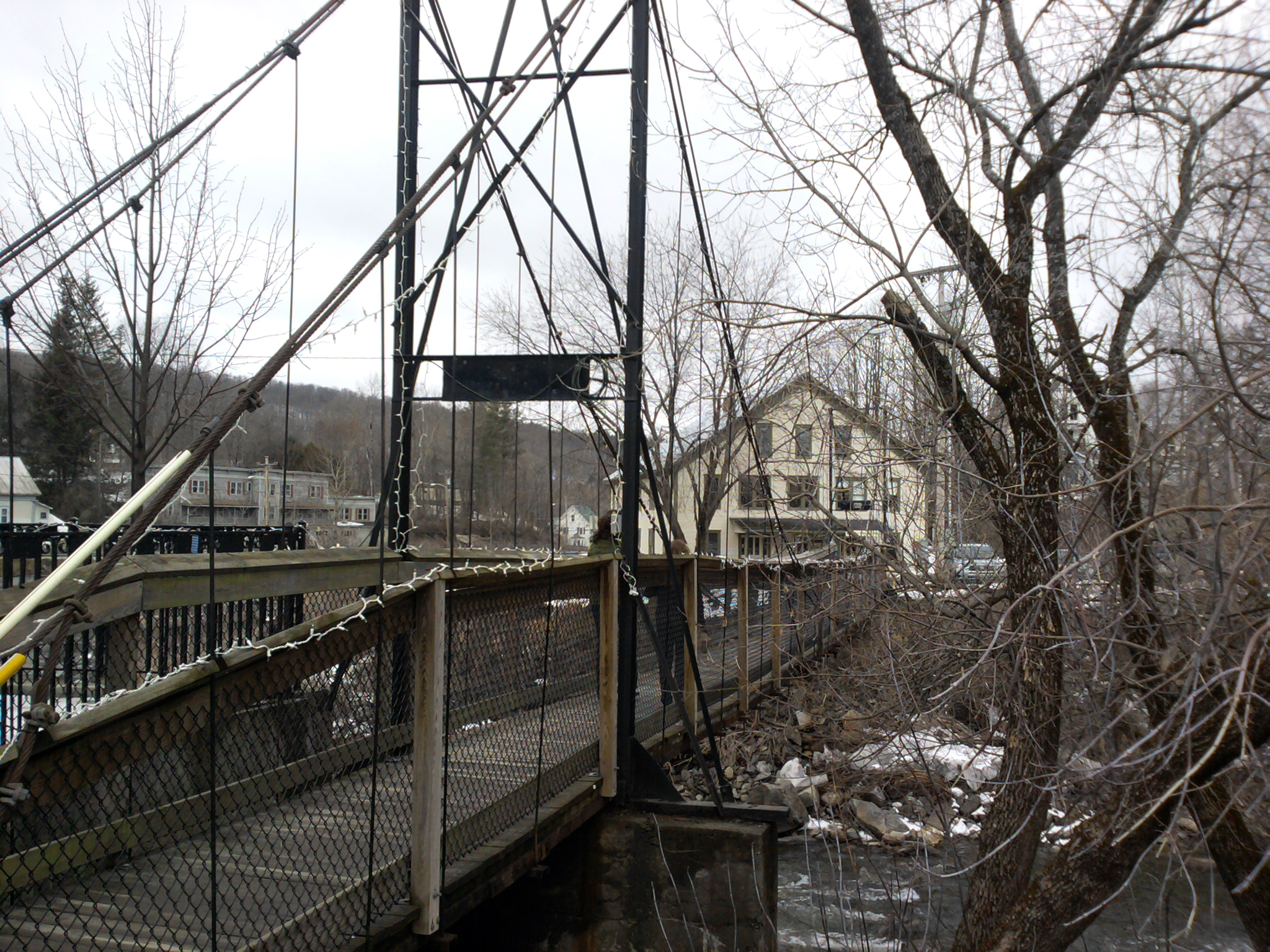
Footbridge over Lamoille River

Emergency Services; Hardwick Fire Department, led by Chief Perley Allen Hardwick Rescue Squad, led by President Michael Lew-Smith Hardwick Police Department, led by Chief Michael (Mike) Henry
