= Frank Livingston Underwood =

American banker and railroad builder

- Born: 26 July 1844; Walden, Vermont, United States
- Died: 17 March 1918 (aged 73); Post-Graduate Hospital
- Occupations: banker, railroad builder
- Known for: building several Western United States railroads
- Spouse: Theodosia I. Hawley (m. 1866)
- Children: three daughters

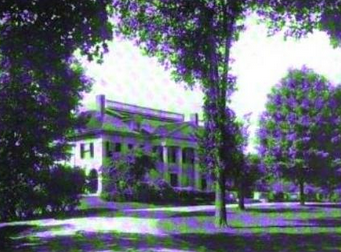
Livingston's home in Litchfield, Connecticut

Frank Livingston Underwood (July 26, 1844 – March 17, 1918) was a US banker and copper magnate who built several Western United States railroads which afterward became parts of larger systems.

== Biography ==
Underwood was born in Walden, Vermont, July 26, 1844, the son of John and Susan (Livingston) Underwood. He was educated in public schools of Lowell, Massachusetts. He married in Muscatine, Iowa on June 30, 1866, Theodosia I. Hawley. Their children were Grace, Pearl, and Blanche.

From Lowell, Underwood moved to Muscatine, Iowa, in 1861. He was a teller in the Muscatine Branch of State Bank of Iowa in 1863, and when this was reorganized under the National Bank Act and became the Muscatine National Bank, he was made cashier.

Underwood organized and was president of the Merchants' National Bank of Kansas City, Missouri, from 1879 until he left the West. He built in 1872 the Muscatine Western Railroad (later, part of the Burlington, Cedar Rapids & Northern Railroad); organized 1882, Cuhaba Coal & Mining Company (later, part of tho Tennessee Coal, Iron & Railroad Company), and built its railway in 1884. He organized 1882, the Arizona Copper Company, and was its first president. He built the Arizona & New Mexico Railroad, 1882, and was its first president. He built in 1886 the Saline, Lincoln & Western Railroad (later part of Union Pacific System, in Kansas). He was one of organizers of the Kansas City Smelting & Refining Company in 1880. He organized in 1882, and was the first president of the Arkansas Valley Smelting Company. He built the Lake Street Elevated Railroad in Chicago in 1893-94, and sold same to Charles T. Yerkes. Underwood built the Arizona-Utah Railroad, 1898, and was its first president. He procured options for and was the promoter of American Smelting & Refining Company, 1898. He was elected president of the British Columbia Copper Company, Ltd, 1902.

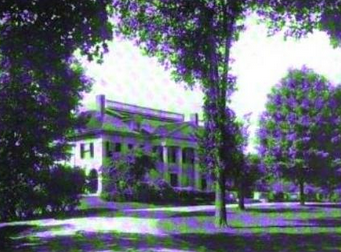
Underwood's home, Litchfield, Connecticut

While living in Iowa, he was agent for the investment of money in the West of capitalists in New England, New York, England and Scotland, and much of the activity was in the promotion of their interests. Underwood was a Democrat. He was a member of the Congregationalism Mem Missouri Society, Iowa Society, New England Society, Chamber of Commerce. He was Chairman of the Committee on Civil Service Reform and chairman of the Library Commission; he belonged to the Reform Club. His summer residence was in Livingwood, Litchfield, Connecticut, the site formerly being known as the Litchfield Female Academy. His permanent address was at 115 Broadway, New York City. He died in 1918 at Post-Graduate Hospital.

== Bibliography ==
- Condé Nast Publications (1909). House & Garden (Public domain ed.). Condé Nast Publications.
- Hamersly, Lewis Randolph (1911). Who's who in New York City and State (Public domain ed.). L.R. Hamersly Company. p. 944.
