= Philip Zuchman =

American landscape painter (1942–2021)

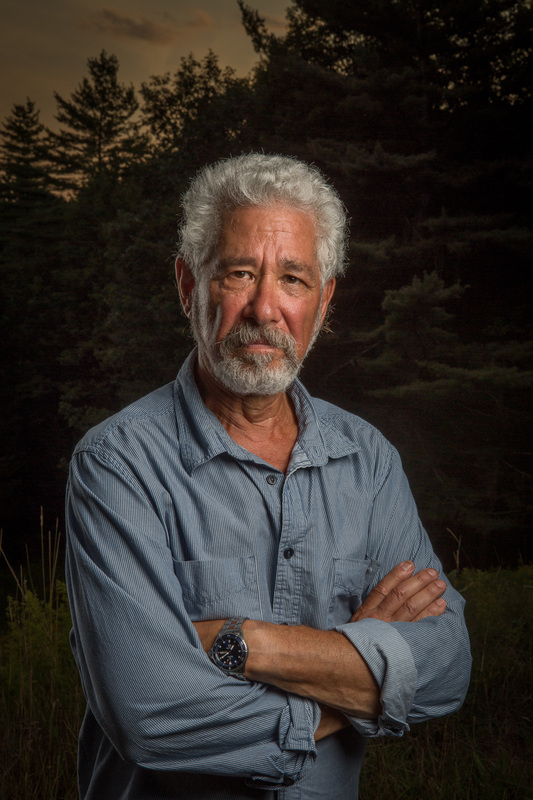
- Born: 1942; New York City
- Died: September 26, 2021; Philadelphia
- Education: MA in painting from Goddard College
- Known for: oil painting, sculpture, encaustic painting
- Spouse: Deborah Zuchman (also uses Deborah Gross-Zuchman)

Philip Abrim Zuchman (/ˈzʌtʃmən/; 1942–2021) was an American landscape painter and visual artist living in Philadelphia, Pennsylvania.

== Early life ==
Philip Zuchman was born in Queens, New York and started painting when he was seven years old. When Zuchman was 14, his mother died from and he left home to live in various lofts around New York City and made a living selling flowers in the city's subway stations. At the age of 18, he and a friend built kayaks for themselves and paddled from Bordentown, New Jersey to the Carolina Sea Islands.

== Education and writing career ==
Although Zuchman did not finish high school, Queens College accepted him for enrollment in 1961. He studied philosophy and writing there, graduating in 1965. He won the Peter Pauper Press Award for two novelettes: Father Never Went to Church But Loved the Soil and A Mass for an Ass.

In 1966 Zuchman served as a psychological research specialist and French interpreter in the U.S. Army. While stationed in Monterey, California he wrote a script based on O. Henry’s story "The Gift of the Magi" that was performed by the Presidio Players in 1966 under the direction of Edward Bach. While in Monterey, Zuchman also developed an aptitude for winemaking.

After his discharge from the army in 1968, Zuchman returned to Manhattan to paint. During this time, he studied with Arthur Foster at the Art Students League of New York. In 1971 the Salmagundi Club awarded him its four-year Young Artist’s Scholarship. Zuchman moved up to a small farmhouse in Walden, Vermont that year to pursue an MA in painting at Goddard College, where he studied with James Gahagan. In 1973 he moved to Philadelphia, PA, where he married fellow artist Deborah Gross.

== Painting career ==
Zuchman served as president of the National Forum of Professional Artists, vice president of Philadelphia Artists Equity, and vice president of the Philadelphia Watercolor Society. He was a Professor of Studio Art and Aesthetics, Emeritus, at the Art Institute of Philadelphia until 2013. Zuchman’s paintings have been exhibited internationally as part of the U.S. State Department’s Art in Embassies Program, for which he was a Cultural Ambassador.

Philip Zuchman spent the final decades of his life living in West Philadelphia with his wife, painter Deborah Gross-Zuchman. The couple restored their 19th century home and studio and occasionally held arts and culture events there up until the onset of the Coronavirus pandemic in 2020. The house features their paintings, carvings, mosaics and murals. In 2013, Philip was named an Honorary Lifetime Member of the Philadelphia Watercolor Society. In 2019, the Puffin Foundation awarded Philip a grant for “Lamentations,” a handmade book dedicated to people, past and present, who have suffered from migration, displacement, and exile. Zuchman also received the Albert Nelson Marquis Lifetime Achievement Award in 2020.

== Artwork ==
Zuchman worked primarily with oils and encaustics. For much of his career, he focused on painting landscapes en plein air.

Zuchman explored in his paintings humanity’s interdependence with nature, saying, "Landscapes are political. There are things in landscapes which we don't think of today as symbols—the road that moves through the landscape, the touch of a building, the fence separating borders, the edges of town. All these things combined together give a picture of man's relationship to the environment." His work also explored broader themes such as social ecology, war, and the possibilities of humanism. "Artists work to expose the nature of existence, to communicate feelings, to activate consciousness, increase human knowledge, to promote justice, and education. They are activists and pioneers who struggle in their lives against forces of isolation, poverty, discrimination, bad legislation, and being misunderstood by the public," he wrote in his "Call to Action."

Zuchman’s commitment to art as a social practice led to his inclusion in several exhibits, including "Art From Detritus" in NYC and "All of Us or None." In 2002, he was featured in Wendy Weinberg's TV special "The Art of Activism," where he said, "I'm willing to go to great lengths sometimes to make a point. When issues grab a hold of me personally—issues of taxes that artists have to pay that are prejudicial, issues of censorship—I get to be a troublemaker. And I'm going to go and write letters and make phone calls. I'm going to do whatever I can do to possibly alter that situation. And I think artists should do this, I think this is very important. We should all be doing the critique of the world we live in."

Describing Zuchman’s use of color in his introduction to Summer on a Hill, Peter London writes, "And it is here in his choice of color schemes that Philip is most inventive. The closely matched greens of midsummer are now replaced with a wider range of tones and tints. And these in turn are now given to us in layers of contrasting hues and saturations. The effect of this broadening and layering is to animate the flat surface of the painting to equal the vibrancy of the constantly changing light, the twirling shift of surfaces of the millions of leaves, grasses and clouds, all within yawning depths of space of nature just as it is. The scarlet and rose and mauve and sepia and chartreuse and cerulean of Philip’s palette replace nature’s own infinite variations on green. And how nature forms its own endless variety of twigs, pebbles, leaves and grasses is now replaced by Philip’s wide range of textured application of paint. Smears, glazes, washes, impastos, scumbles, blotches and the like build an uneven surface of the painting making the whole pulsate, again, like the shimmering of the light on any portion of nature’s beauty."

== Death ==
Philip Zuchman was diagnosed with pancreatic cancer in August 2021 and died at home in September.
