= Prohibition Park =

- Temperance town
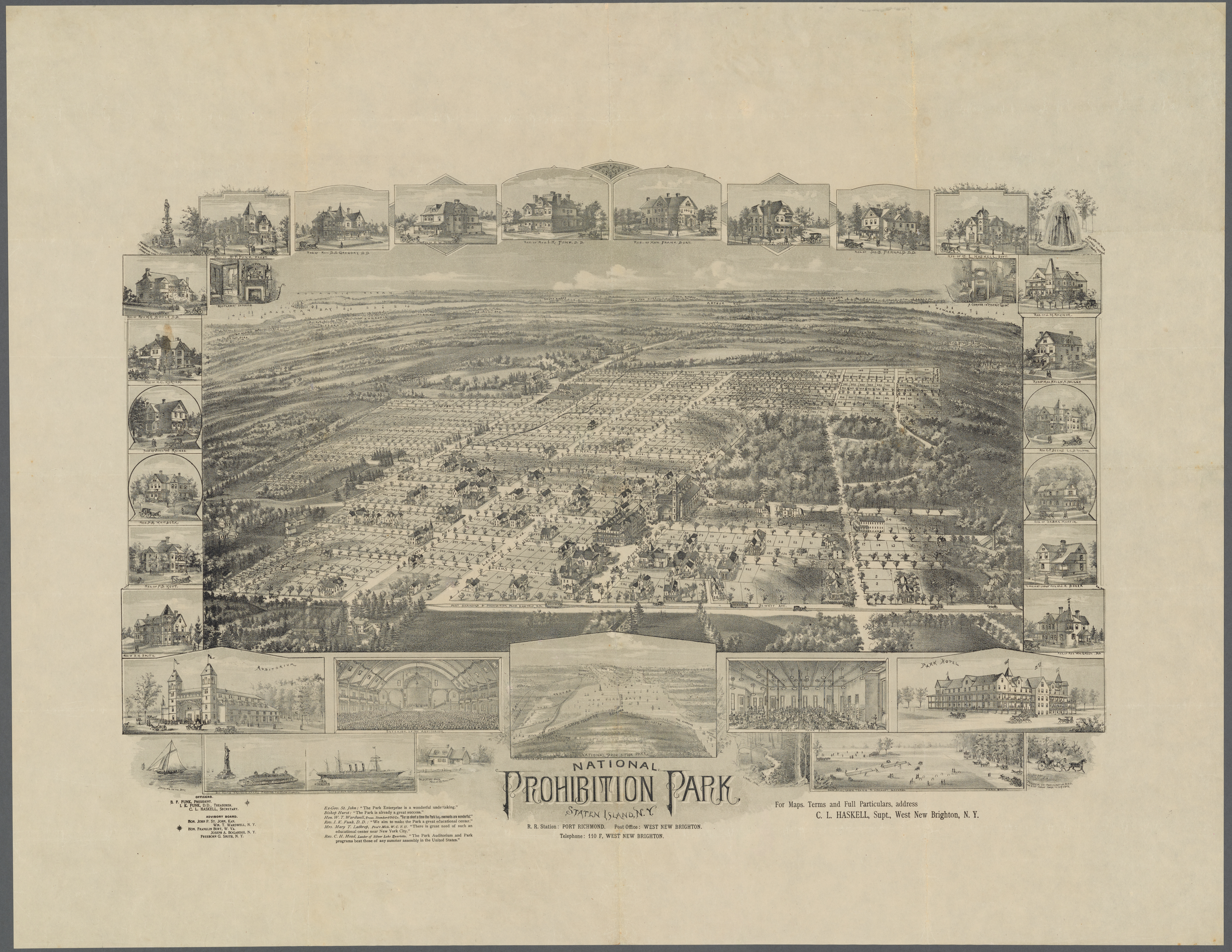
- 1890s map of National Prohibition Park
- Country: United States
- State: New York
- City: New York City
- Borough: Staten Island
- Founded: 1887
- Opened: July 4, 1888
- Ceased: 1907
- Named for: Prohibition Party

Prohibition Park, also called National Prohibition Park, was a temperance town and park used as a summer colony in the New York City borough of Staten Island, precursor to the modern Westerleigh neighborhood. The park and community were founded after the purchase of the land in 1887 by members of the National Prohibition Party (serving as the party's headquarters) during a temperance movement prior to Federal prohibition in the United States, with the specification that no consumption of alcohol would be permitted in the area. At its peak the park had extended nearly 150 acres, but declined in the 1900s along with the temperance movement, with much of the land sold to non-movement members. The remaining parkland was obtained by the City in 1907, surviving as Westerleigh Park and Northerleigh Park operated by the New York City Parks Department.

== History ==
The area of Prohibition Park and modern Westerleigh began as part of the 5,100 acres estate of Thomas Dongan, Colonial Governor of New York under British rule, purchased in 1683. The land was purchased in 1848 by New York politician John Vanderbilt. Between 25 acres (100,000 m^{2}) and 56 acres (230,000 m^{2}) of land were purchased from Vanderbilt's daughter in 1887 by Christopher S. Williams and Manhattan Methodist pastor William H. Boole on behalf of the National Prohibition Party. The party intended on founding a reclusive summer retreat in response to apparent widespread crime and blight in the city attributed to alcohol consumption. The park was opened on July 4, 1888, and was operated by the National Prohibition Campground Association (later the National Prohibition Park Company). In its first year of existence, 60,000 people visited the park. A 4000-seat auditorium called University Temple opened in 1891. By 1897, the park had grown to 150 acres (610,000 m^{2}) in size, with a yearly attendance of 200,000.

The park consisted of campground, a picnic grove, tennis courts, ball fields, horse stables and other recreational facilities. Visitors would stay in tents anchored to wooden platforms. Any open lots not used for campsites were used for development, giving way to permanent buildings including a bowling alley, a large hotel called the Park Hotel, and several small hotels. Events at the park included temperance rallies, religious and temperance meetings, educational lectures, and Chautauqua entertainment.

The park was served by a surface trolley line (operated by the Port Richmond and Prohibition Park Electric Railway Company) on Jewett Avenue beginning in 1892, originating in Port Richmond. This would connect to ferries in the northern shore of Port Richmond, or the Staten Island Railway's North Shore Branch and additional trolley service towards Saint George Terminal.

=== Residential development ===
In 1892, the area began transitioning into a permanent residential community. Over 1,000 building sites were created, each with a deed prohibiting the use, manufacture, or sale of liquor. Single-family homes in Victorian, Dutch, and English stylings were constructed. Streets were constructed in the neighborhood, named after prominent Prohibition figures. The Westerleigh Collegiate Association, a private school which offered education from Kindergarten to college, opened in 1895.

Initially selling only to fellow temperance followers, in the 1900s the Park Company began selling lots to non-members of the movement. This, along with declining park attendance, and the destruction of the University Temple and Westerleigh Collegiate in 1903 due to separate fires, led to the decline of Prohibition Park. The community was renamed Westerleigh, and the remaining undeveloped parkland was acquired by New York City in 1907.

== Residents ==
- William H. Boole, a park trustee and juryman who died there in 1896.
