= Robert T. Carey =

American politician

Robert T. Carey was an American from Clinton, Wisconsin who served as a Whig member of the 1st Wisconsin Legislature and as a member of the Wisconsin State Assembly from the district of Rock County consisting of the towns of Beloit, Clinton and Turtle.
