= Building at 143 Highland Avenue =

- U.S. National Register of Historic Places
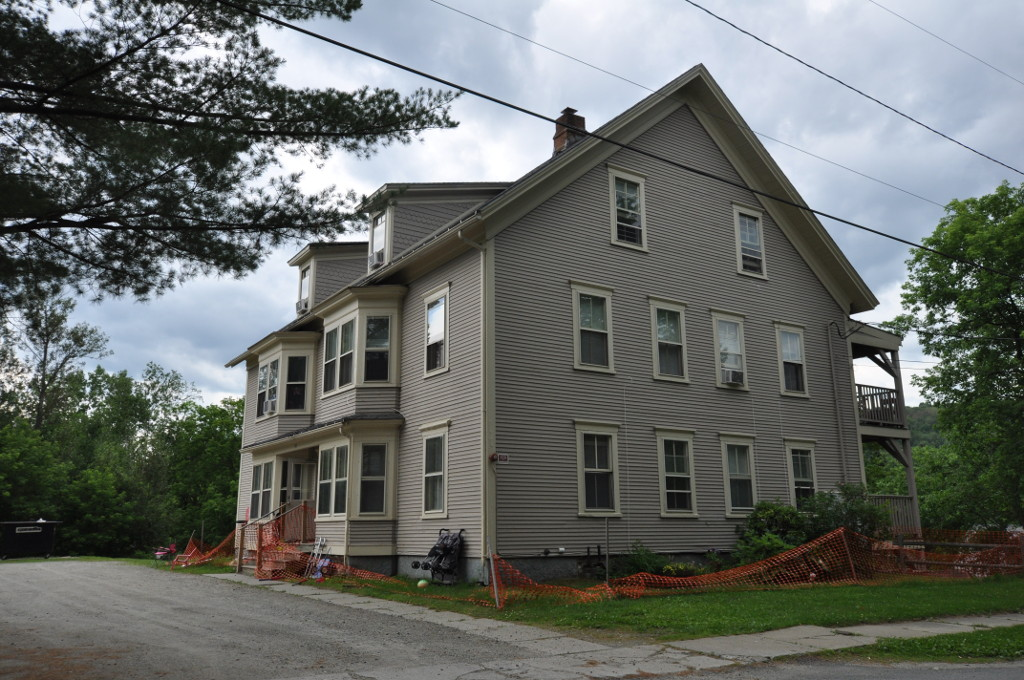

- Location within Vermont Location within the United States
- Location: 143 Highland Ave., Hardwick, Vermont
- Coordinates: 44°30′22″N 72°22′7″W
- Area: less than one acre
- Built: 1889
- Architectural style: Tenement
- NRHP reference No.: 00000358
- Added to NRHP: April 6, 2000

143 Highland Avenue is a well-preserved late 19th-century tenement house in the town of Hardwick, Vermont. It was built about 1889 to serve as housing for workers in the area's granite quarries, and preserves a number of the utilitarian features that characterize these types of worker housing. It was listed on the National Register of Historic Places in 2000.

== Description and history ==
143 Highland Avenue is located in a residential area north of the commercial center of Hardwick, on the south side of Highland Avenue between Daniels Road and Riverside Terrace. It is a large 2 1/2-story wood-frame structure, with a gabled roof and clapboarded exterior. Its main facade is oriented to the east, facing its parking area. It is symmetrically arranged and five bays wide, with a modest center entrance sheltered by a shed-roof porch that extends between flanking polygonal bays. The roof above is pierced by two shed-roof single-window dormers. The gabled sides are four bays wide; with the basement exposed at the rear and left side due to the lot's sloping terrain. The interior houses mirror-image units on the first and second floors, with an additional unit in the attic space. The basic layout of the first and second floor units is historical, although accommodations have been made for plumbing (not present in the original construction) during rehabilitation of the structure. Period woodwork was retained during the rehabilitation as much as possible, and an ahistoric rear porch system was replaced by one more closely resembling that of early photographs.

This building was constructed about 1889, in order to address burgeoning demand for worker housing in the area's granite quarries and processing sheds. Unlike other industrial communities, Hardwick's businesses did not build company-owned housing to satisfy this demand, relying instead on local residents to provide housing. This tenement was apparently built by J.J. Campbell, who purchased the parcel and lived in a house across the street.

== See also ==
- National Register of Historic Places listings in Caledonia County, Vermont
