= Samuel S. Jones (Wisconsin politician) =

American politician

Samuel S. Jones (September 3, 1854 – November 26, 1912) was an American farmer, teacher, and politician.

== Biography ==
Jones was born on September 3, 1854, in Clinton (town), Rock County, Wisconsin. He owned a farm in his native town and in the nearby Clinton (village), Rock County, Wisconsin. He went to the Clinton public schools and to the Allen's Grove Academy. Jones also went to Milton College. He taught school from 1873 to 1880. He also served as county highway commissioner for Rock County, Wisconsin. Jones died on November 26, 1912, at his home in the town of Clinton.

His former home, now known as the Samuel S. Jones Cobblestone House, is listed on the National Register of Historic Places.

== Political career ==
Jones was a member of the Wisconsin State Assembly in 1895 and 1896. Additionally, he was town clerk and chairman (similar to mayor) of the town board (similar to city council) of Clinton and chairman of the county board of Rock County, Wisconsin. Jones also served on the school board and was the clerk of the school board. He was a Republican.
