= 1868 Vermont gubernatorial election =

- September 8, 1868
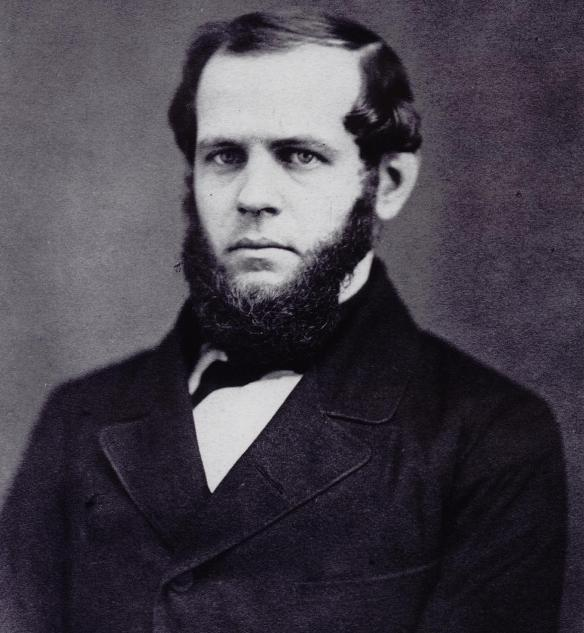

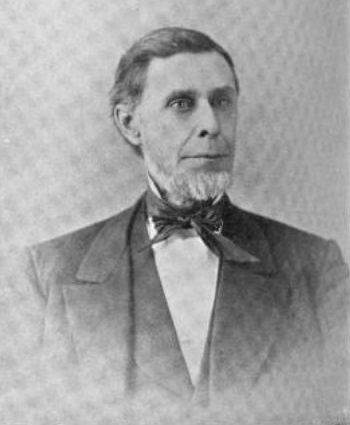
Candidate	John B. Page	John L. Edwards
Party	Republican	Democratic
Popular vote	42,615	15,289
Percentage	73.50%	26.37%
- County results Page: 60–70% 70–80% 80–90%
Governor before election
John B. Page
Republican
Elected Governor
John B. Page
Republican

The 1868 Vermont gubernatorial election took place on September 8, 1868. Incumbent Republican John B. Page, per the "Mountain Rule", successfully ran for re-election to a second term as Governor of Vermont, defeating Democratic candidate John L. Edwards.

== Results ==
1868 Vermont gubernatorial election
Party	Candidate	Votes	%	±%
Republican	John B. Page (inc.)	42,615	73.50	
Democratic	John L. Edwards	15,289	26.37	
N/A	Other	74	0.13	
Total votes		57,978	100.0	
