= Hardwick Street Historic District =

Historic district in Vermont, United States

- U.S. National Register of Historic Places
- U.S. Historic district
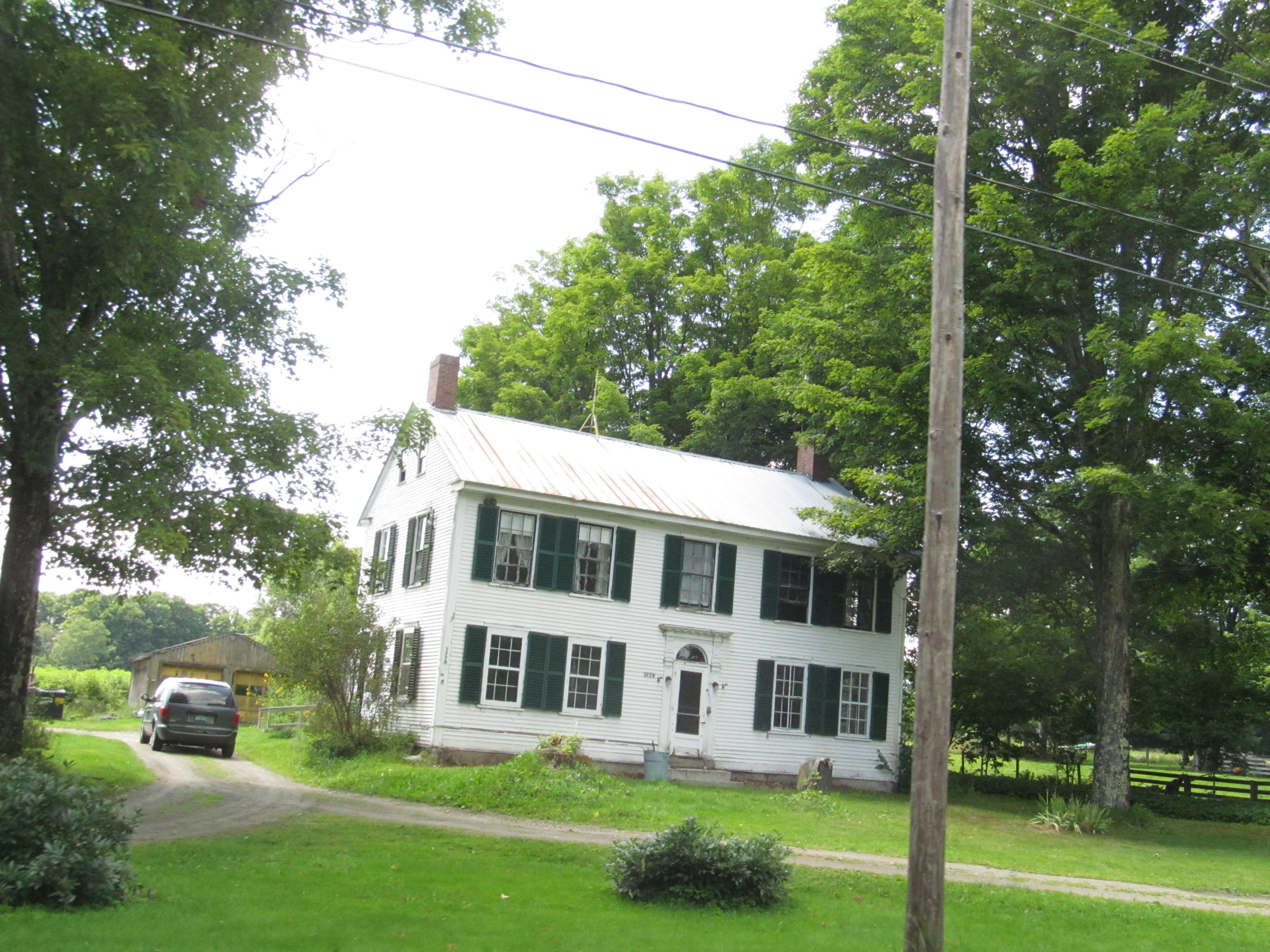

- Location within Vermont Location within the United States
- Location: Hardwick Street and Bayley-Hazen Road, Hardwick, Vermont
- Coordinates: 44°33′0″N 72°17′58″W
- Area: 120 acres (49 ha)
- Architectural style: Greek Revival, Federal
- NRHP reference No.: 79000321
- Added to NRHP: June 22, 1979

The Hardwick Street Historic District encompasses the earliest settlement area of Hardwick, Vermont. Extending along Hardwick Street and Bayley-Hazen Road in a rural area of eastern Hardwick, it includes eight farm properties dating to the early 19th century. It was listed on the National Register of Historic Places in 1979.

== Description and history ==
The town of Hardwick was first settled in 1793, by Asa Warner. He came along the Bayley-Hazen Military Road, built by Continental Army forces during the American Revolutionary War as a potential route for an attack on the British Province of Quebec. The road was never used militarily, but opened remote northern Vermont for settlement. Warner settled in what is now eastern Hardwick, on a stretch of Hardwick Street that is part of the old military road, and operated an inn and stagecoach tavern. Others followed, and by 1810 the area also had a post office and general store, a building that now survives as a private residence. The area was eclipsed in economic and civic importance after the American Civil War.

The historic district covers a stretch of Hardwick Street, roughly between Country Club Road in the north and the Bayley-Hazen Road to the south, and extends along the latter road to the Hazen Road Cemetery, where many of the region's early settlers are buried. The historic buildings in the district are generally wood-frame structures 1-1/2 or 2-1/2 stories in height, and were built between about 1810 and 1855. Also included in the district is a stone marker placed by a local Grange organization in 1906, marking the history of the military road.

== See also ==
- National Register of Historic Places listings in Caledonia County, Vermont
