= 1867 Vermont gubernatorial election =

- September 3, 1867
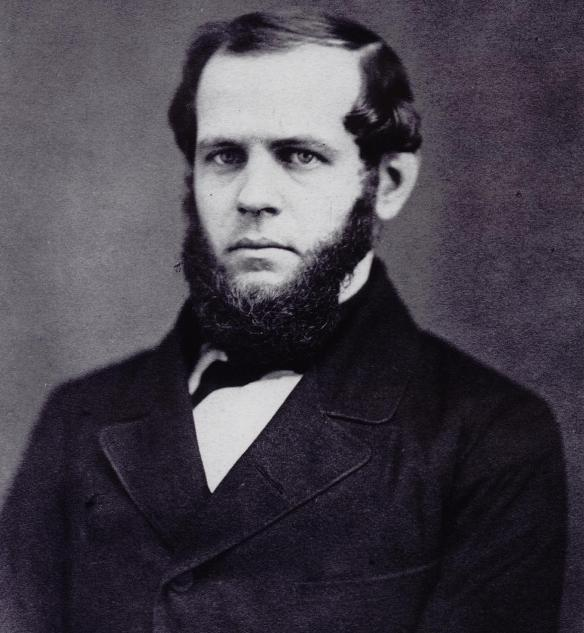

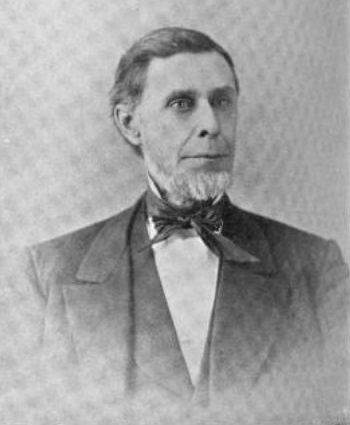
Candidate	John B. Page	John L. Edwards
Party	Republican	Democratic
Popular vote	31,694	11,510
Percentage	73.32%	26.63%
- County results Page: 60–70% 70–80% 80–90% >90%
Governor before election
Paul Dillingham
Republican
Elected Governor
John B. Page
Republican

The 1867 Vermont gubernatorial election took place on September 3, 1867. In keeping with the "Mountain Rule", incumbent Republican Paul Dillingham was not a candidate for another term as governor of Vermont. The Republican nomination was won by John B. Page, who had previously served as Vermont State Treasurer. The Democratic nomination was won by John L. Edwards of Newport, who had previously served as State's Attorney of Orleans County. In the general election, Page was elected to a one-year term as governor.

== Results ==
1867 Vermont gubernatorial election
Party	Candidate	Votes	%	±%
Republican	John B. Page	31,694	73.32	
Democratic	John L. Edwards	11,510	26.63	
N/A	Scattering	22	0.05	
Total votes		43,226	100.0	
