= John Conley (Wisconsin politician) =

American politician

John Conley was a Canadian-born American politician. He was a member of the Wisconsin State Assembly.

== Biography ==
Conley was born on December 26, 1828, in Three Rivers, Lower Canada. He later resided in Clinton, Wisconsin.

== Career ==
Conley was a member of the Assembly during the 1882 and 1883 sessions. Additionally, he was a member of the town board of Clinton and the county board of Rock County, Wisconsin. He was a Republican.
