= Walden, Vermont =

- Town
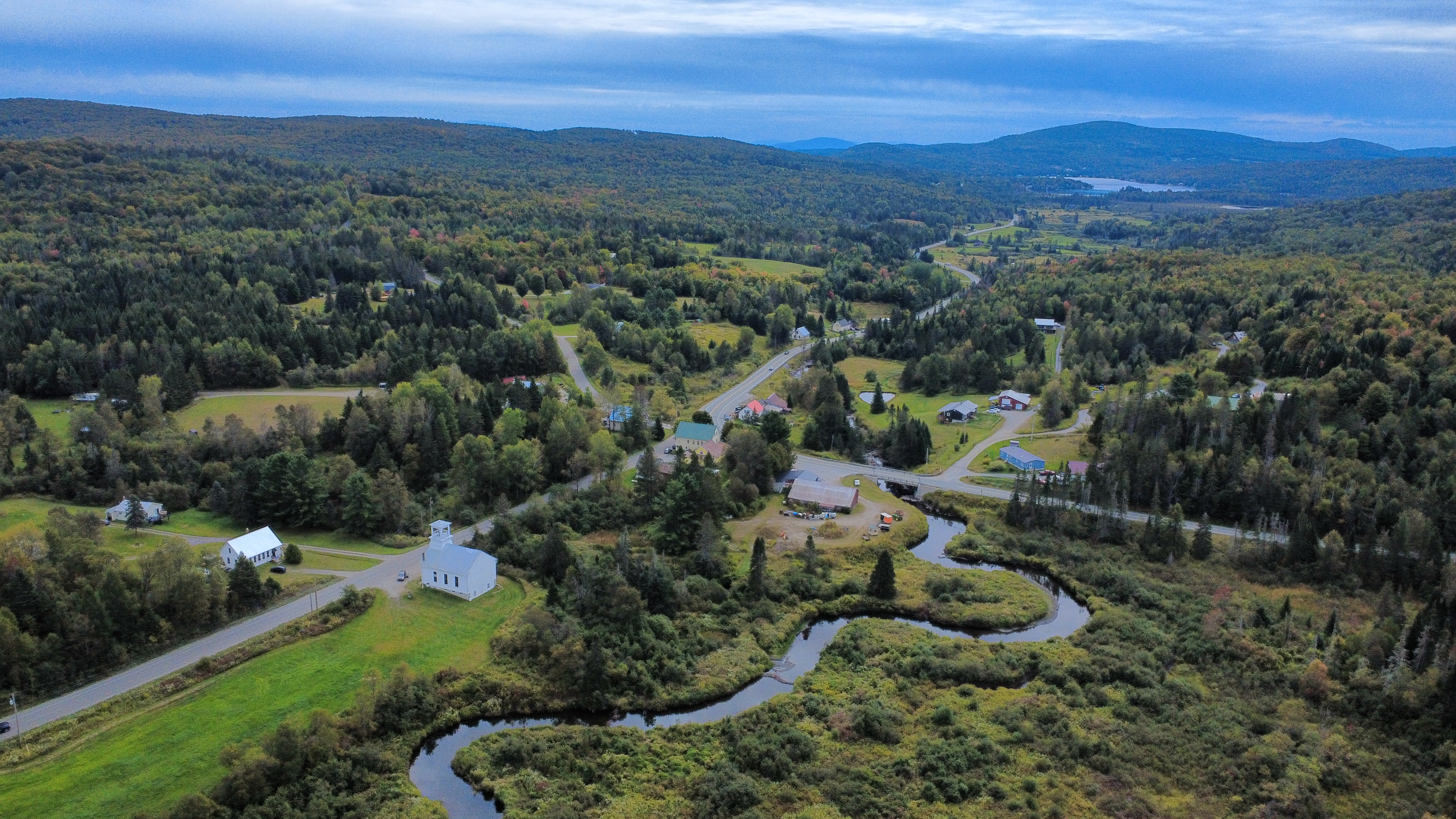
- Walden, VT, from the north

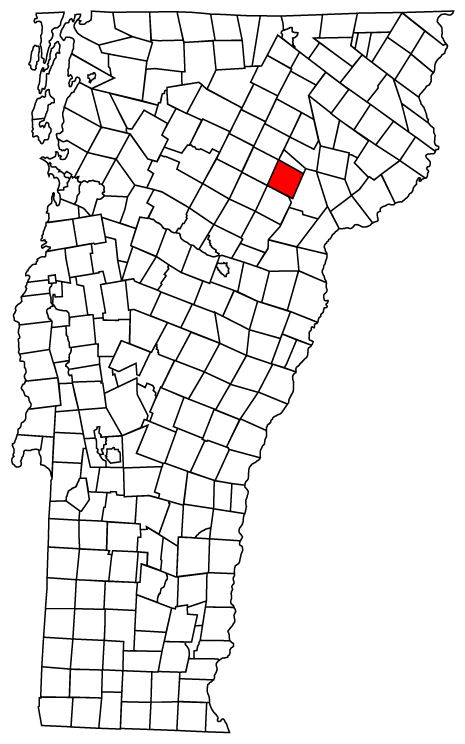
- Walden, Vermont
- Coordinates: 44°29′48″N 72°15′26″W
- Country: United States
- State: Vermont
- County: Caledonia
- Communities: Walden; Dows Crossing; South Walden; Walden Heights

Area
  - Total: 39.0 sq mi (100.9 km^{2})
  - Land: 38.6 sq mi (99.9 km^{2})
  - Water: 0.35 sq mi (0.9 km^{2})
- Elevation: 1,880 ft (570 m)

Population (2020)
  - Total: 956
  - Density: 25/sq mi (9.6/km^{2})
- Time zone: UTC-5 (Eastern (EST))
  - Summer (DST): UTC-4 (EDT)
- ZIP codes: 05873 (West Danville); 05843 (Hardwick); 05836 (East Hardwick); 05828 (Danville)
- Area code: 802
- FIPS code: 50-75700
- GNIS feature ID: 1462238
- Website: waldenvt.gov

Walden is a town in Caledonia County, Vermont, United States. The population was 956 at the 2020 census. The community has no ZIP code of its own; mail is routed through the West Danville and East Hardwick post offices.

== Geography ==
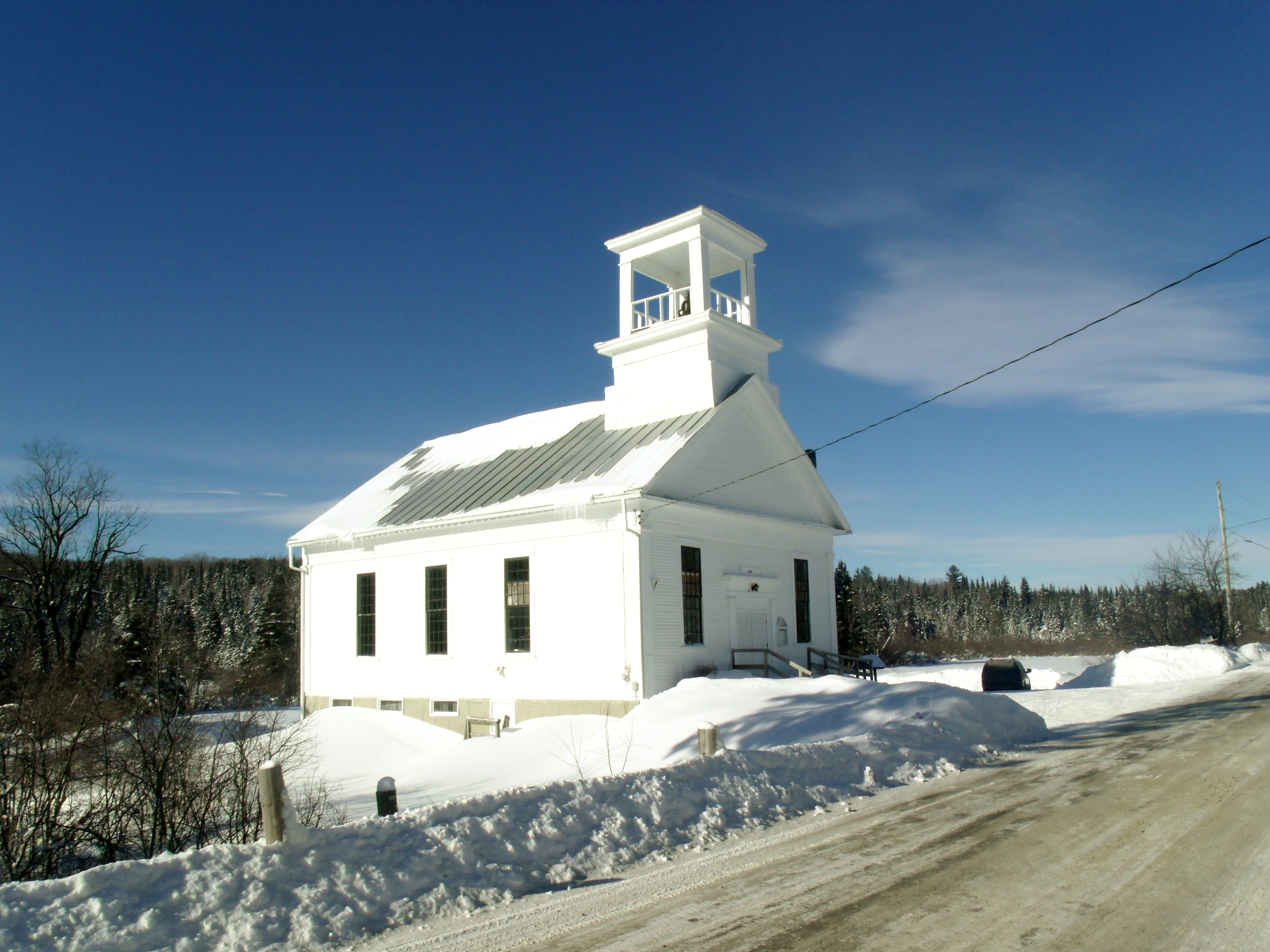
Walden United Methodist Church

According to the United States Census Bureau, the town has a total area of 39.0 square miles (100.9 km^{2}), of which 38.6 square miles (99.9 km^{2}) is land and 0.35 square miles (0.9 km^{2}), or 0.91%, is water. Vermont Route 15 passes through the town, leading west to Hardwick and Morrisville and east to Danville. It is 17 miles (27 km) east via VT 15 and U.S. Route 2 to St. Johnsbury, Vermont.

The highest point in Walden is the summit of Stannard Mountain, near the town's northern border, with an elevation of over 2,579 feet (786 m) above sea level.

== Demographics ==
Historical population
Census	Pop.	Note	%±
1790	11		—
1800	153		1,290.9%
1810	455		197.4%
1820	580		27.5%
1830	827		42.6%
1840	913		10.4%
1850	910		−0.3%
1860	1,099		20.8%
1870	992		−9.7%
1880	931		−6.1%
1890	810		−13.0%
1900	764		−5.7%
1910	739		−3.3%
1920	674		−8.8%
1930	664		−1.5%
1940	547		−17.6%
1950	481		−12.1%
1960	427		−11.2%
1970	442		3.5%
1980	575		30.1%
1990	703		22.3%
2000	782		11.2%
2010	935		19.6%
2020	956		2.2%
U.S. Decennial Census

As of the census of 2000, there were 782 people, 301 households, and 219 families residing in the town. The population density was 20.2 people per square mile (7.8/km^{2}). There were 499 housing units at an average density of 12.9 per square mile (5.0/km^{2}). The racial makeup of the town was 98.21% White, 0.51% African American, 0.13% Native American, 0.13% from other races, and 1.02% from two or more races. Hispanic or Latino of any race were 0.26% of the population.

There were 301 households, out of which 39.5% had children under the age of 18 living with them, 58.5% were married couples living together, 12.0% had a female householder with no husband present, and 27.2% were non-families. 22.9% of all households were made up of individuals, and 7.6% had someone living alone who was 65 years of age or older. The average household size was 2.60 and the average family size was 3.04.

In the town, the population was spread out, with 28.5% under the age of 18, 6.1% from 18 to 24, 30.1% from 25 to 44, 25.4% from 45 to 64, and 9.8% who were 65 years of age or older. The median age was 36 years. For every 100 females, there were 100.0 males. For every 100 females age 18 and over, there were 99.6 males.

The median income for a household in the town was $37,500, and the median income for a family was $40,625. Males had a median income of $29,625 versus $21,875 for females. The per capita income for the town was $17,253. About 5.4% of families and 7.8% of the population were below the poverty line, including 10.1% of those under age 18 and 6.0% of those age 65 or over.

== Notable people ==
- Charles J. Bell (1845–1909), governor of Vermont from 1904 to 1906
- Carrie Breck (1855–1934), poet and hymnwriter
- John L. Edwards (1819–1895), Attorney and politician, Democratic nominee for governor of Vermont in 1867 and 1868
- George P. Foster (1835–1879), Union Army brevet brigadier general and U.S. Marshal for Vermont
- Luther Gulick (1892–1993), social scientist
- Judith Jones (1924–2017), author, editor The Diary of Anne Frank
- Josiah O. Livingston (1837–1917), Civil War recipient of the Medal of Honor
- Stephen C. Shurtleff, attorney and Democratic politician, born in Walden
- Frank Livingston Underwood (1844–1918), banker, copper magnate, railroad founder
- Philip Zuchman (1942–2021), artist
