= Downtown Hardwick Village Historic District =

Historic district in Vermont, United States

- U.S. National Register of Historic Places
- U.S. Historic district
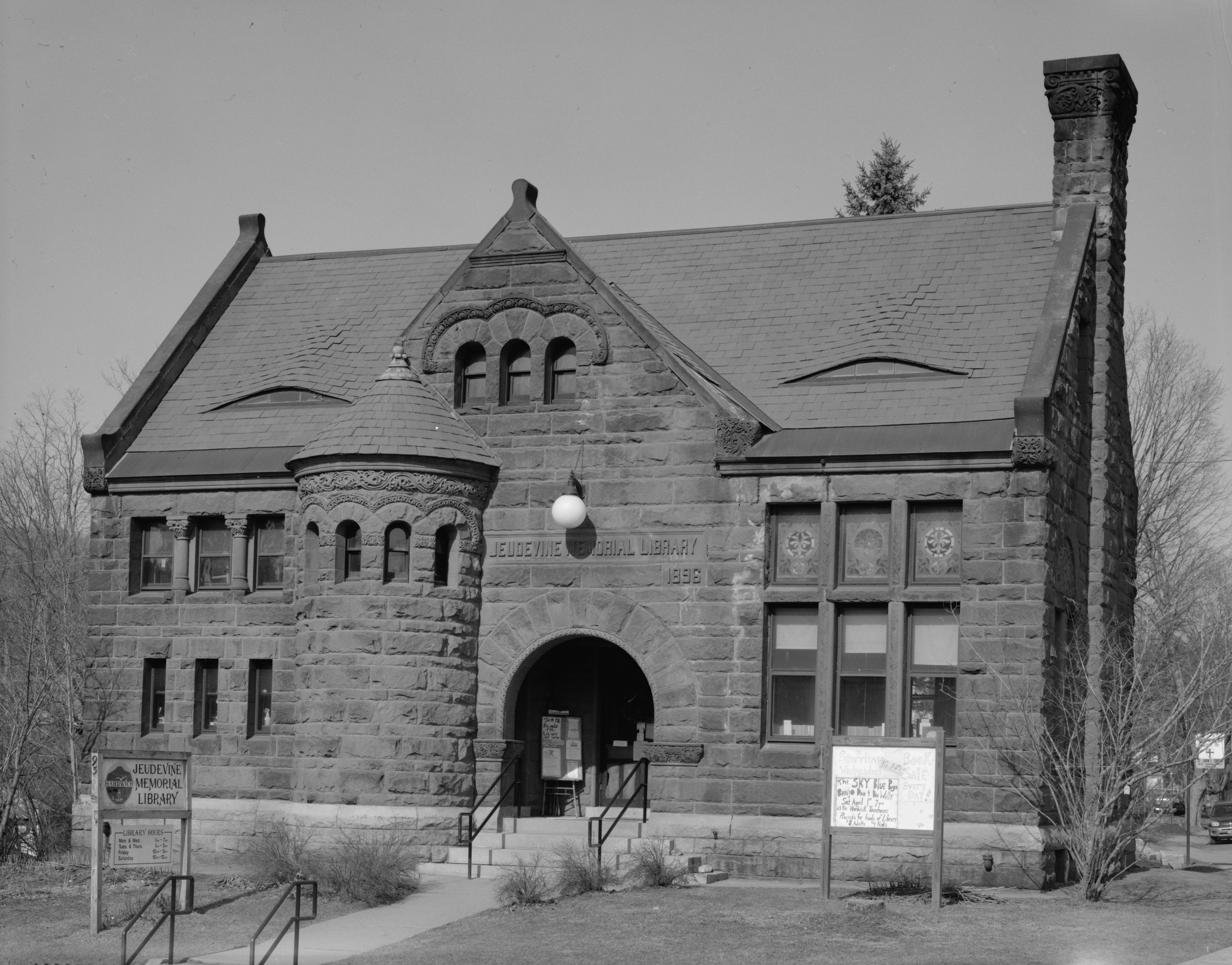
- Jeudevine Memorial Library, HABS photo taken in 2006

- Location within Vermont Location within the United States
- Location: Main, Church, Maple and Mill Sts., Hardwick, Vermont
- Coordinates: 44°30′19″N 72°21′50″W
- Area: 35 acres (14 ha)
- Architectural style: Greek Revival, Queen Anne, Late Victorian
- NRHP reference No.: 82001698 (original); 04000161 (increase)

Significant dates
- Added to NRHP: September 30, 1982
- Boundary increase: March 10, 2004

The Downtown Hardwick Village Historic District encompasses a significant portion of the downtown area of Hardwick, Vermont. The town developed in the 19th century first as a small industrial center, and later became one of the world's leading processors of granite. The district was listed on the National Register of Historic Places in 1982.

== Description and history ==
The town of Hardwick was first settled in 1781, but a town government was not established in 1794. The village now called Hardwick was established in 1795, when John Bridgman established a sawmill and gristmill on the Lamoille River. It was originally called South Hardwick, but as it rose in economic importance in the 19th century, it was renamed to just Hardwick. Granite was quarried from the hills surrounding the village beginning 1845, and by 1911 it was home to the largest granite-processing business in the world, the Woodbury Granite Company. It declined thereafter, with fire and flood taking their toll on Main Street in the 1920s.

The historic district's central area is a one-block stretch of South Main Street, between Wolcott and Main Streets. It extends north along Main Street and then east along Church and Maple Streets, as well as extending east along Mill Street from its junction with Main and South Main. Portions of the district are commercial in nature while some of the outer areas are more residential. The time period between 1820 and 1860 is well represented in the village architecture, with a number of fine Greek Revival buildings. The other major periods represented are the 1870s, when a number of Second Empire commercial buildings were erected, and the Late Victorian. Probably the most architecturally sophisticated building in the village is the 1896 Jeudevine Memorial Library.

== See also ==
- National Register of Historic Places listings in Caledonia County, Vermont
