= Governor Page =

Governor Page may refer to:

- Carroll S. Page (1843–1925), 43rd Governor of Vermont
- John Page (New Hampshire politician) (1787–1865), 17th Governor of New Hampshire
- John Page (Virginia politician) (1743–1808), 13th Governor of Virginia
- John B. Page (1826–1885), 30th Governor of Vermont
