= Cobb School =

- U.S. National Register of Historic Places
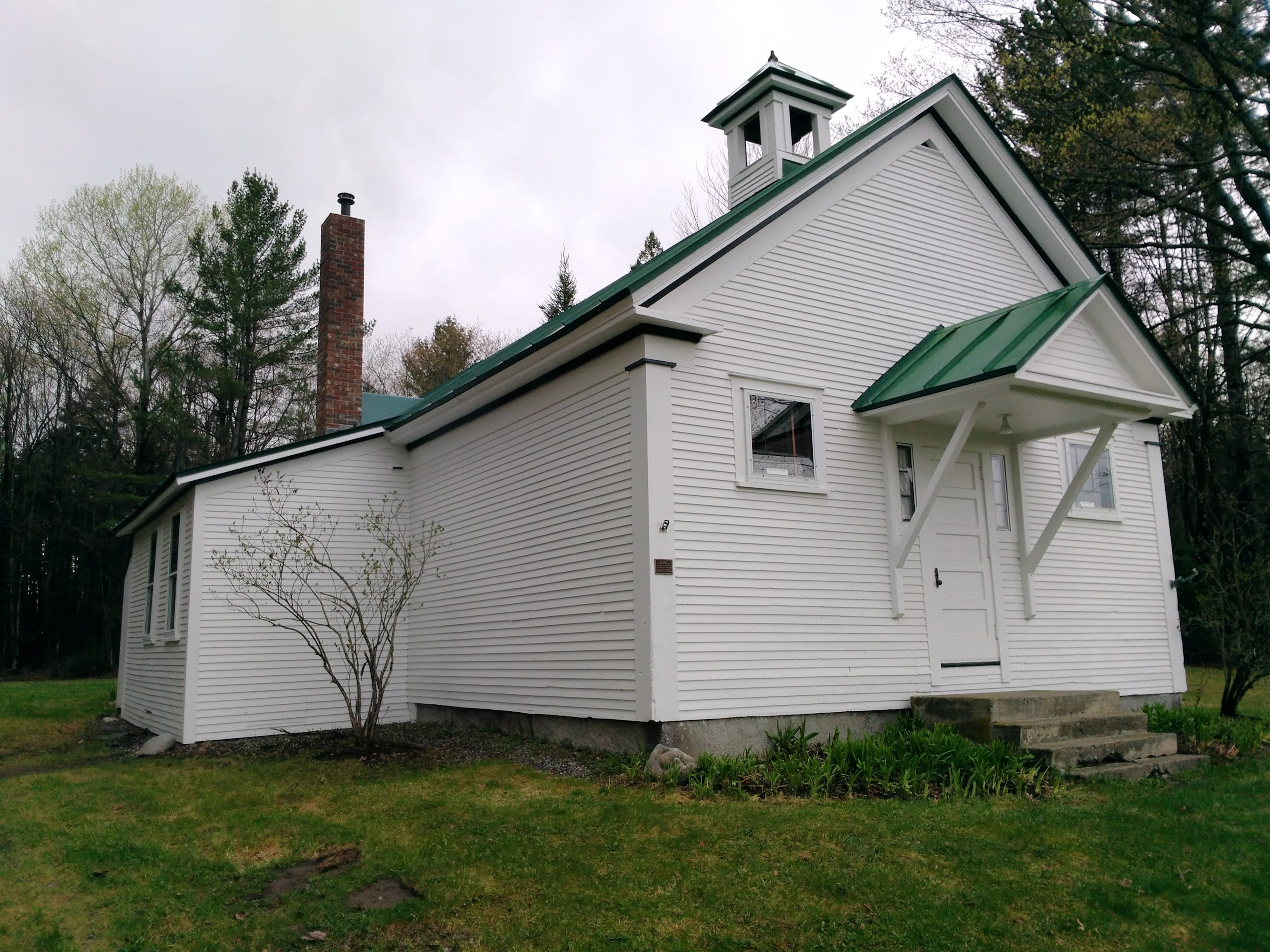

- Location within Vermont Location within the United States
- Location: Jct. of Hardwick Town Hwy. 10 (Cobb School Rd.) and Bridgman Hill Rd., Hardwick, Vermont
- Coordinates: 44°33′23″N 72°20′32″W
- Area: 0.7 acres (0.28 ha)
- Built: 1840
- Architectural style: Greek Revival
- MPS: Educational Resources of Vermont MPS
- NRHP reference No.: 93001007
- Added to NRHP: September 30, 1993

The Cobb School is a historic district schoolhouse at Cobb School Road and Bridgman Hill Road in Hardwick, Vermont. Built in the 1840s, it is a well-preserved example of a Greek Revival district school building. It served as a school until 1946, aided by modernization steps taken in the early 20th century to maintain state standards. It was listed on the National Register of Historic Places in 1993.

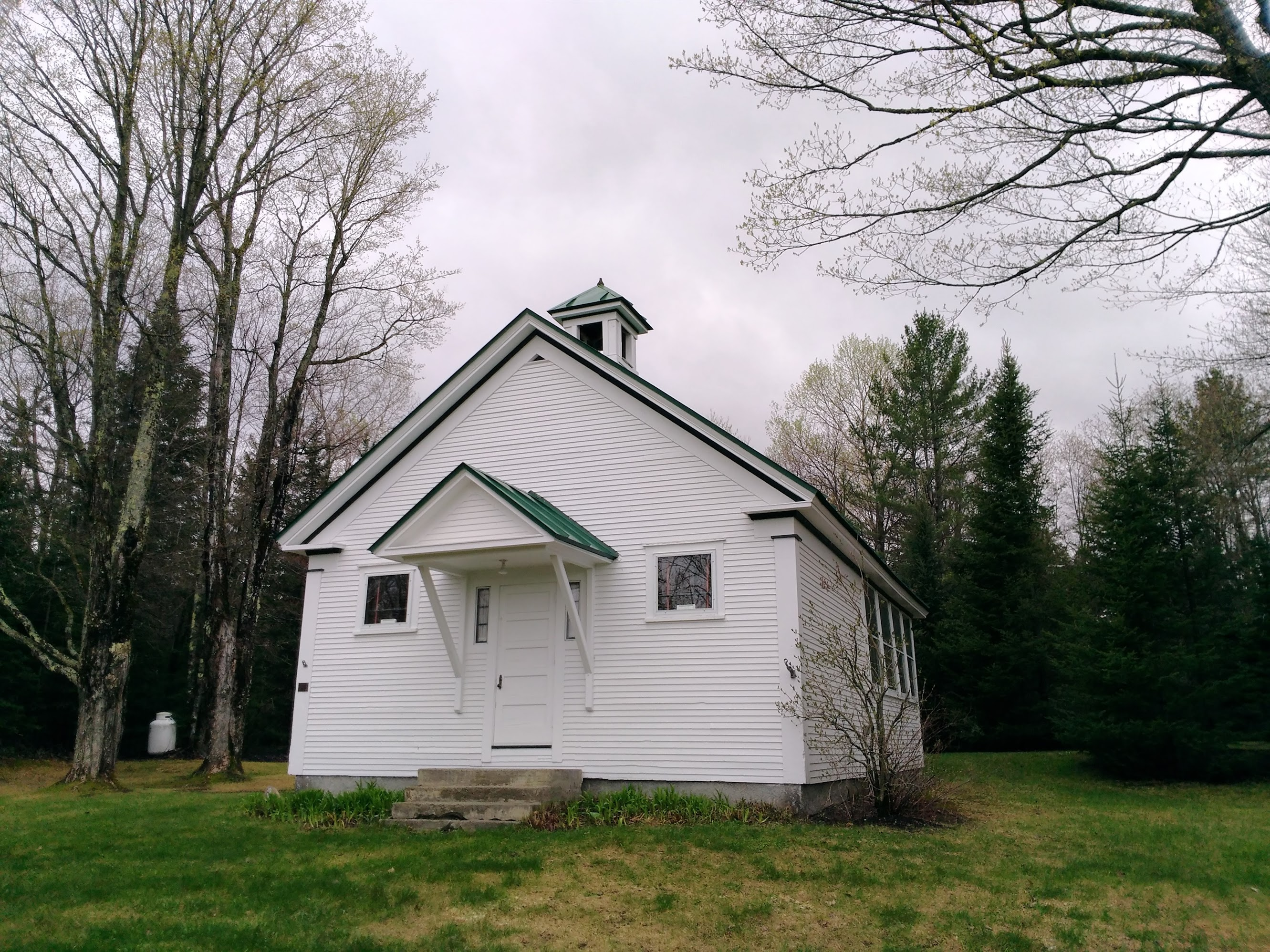
Cobb School

== Description and history ==
The former Cobb School building stands in a rural area of central northern Hardwick, on a wooded lot at the west side of the junction of Cobb School and Bridgman Hill Roads. It is a single-story wood-frame structure, with a front-facing gabled roof, clapboarded exterior, and a foundation of large granite slabs. A square open belfry rises from the center of the roof ridge, capped by a pyramidal roof. The main facade is three bays wide, with outer bays housing small fixed-pane square windows, and the centered entrance flanked by sidelight windows and topped by a hood with large plain angled brackets. The building corners have simple pilasters, which rise to an entablature on the sides. The north side entablature is interrupted by a bank of windows, an early 1900s alteration. The building interior has been converted to residential use.

The Cobb School was built to serve Hardwick's District Four in the 1840s. It was built on land donated by John Cobb, to whom school-designated land had been leased by the town as a means of subsidizing the costs of education. The school underwent an interior update in the late 19th century, and in the early 20th century two banks of windows were added, a response to state standards on lighting conditions in schools. The building was electrified in 1915, but was never fitted with plumbing while it served as a school. It closed, due to declining enrollment and a comparatively high cost of operation in 1946. It was then converted into a residence.

== See also ==
- National Register of Historic Places listings in Caledonia County, Vermont
