= Dustin Grow Cheever =

American politician

Dustin Grow Cheever (January 30, 1830 – February 6, 1897) was a member of the Wisconsin State Assembly.

== Biography ==
Cheever was born on January 30, 1830, in Hardwick, Vermont. In June 1851, he moved to Clinton (town), Rock County, Wisconsin, where he worked, among other things, as a farmer. He was a Baptist.

In 1853, Cheever married Christiana Grow. They had two children before her death on January 1, 1873. Cheever later married Dell Louisa Bailey, a widowed mother of one, on October 17, 1878. He died in February 1897.

== Political career ==
Cheever was a member of the Assembly in 1872 and 1873. Other positions he held include Town Clerk and Chairman of the Town Board (similar to city council) of Clinton, county supervisor of Rock County, Wisconsin, and justice of the peace. He was a Republican.
