= Clinton (town), Rock County, Wisconsin =

Town of Clinton, Wisconsin
- Town
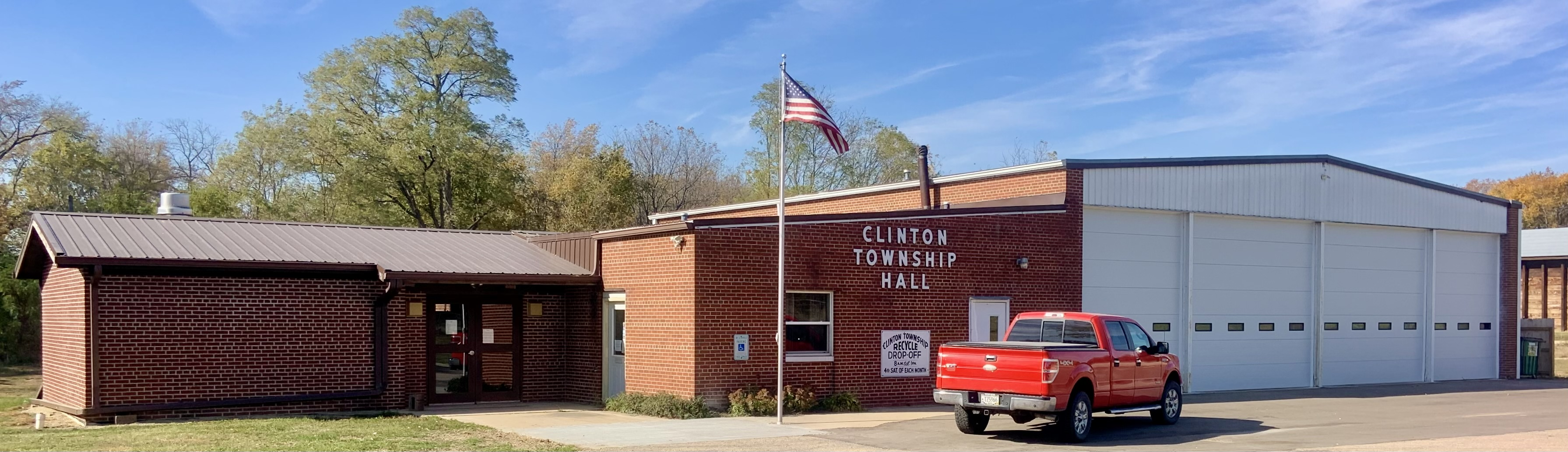
- Town hall in the Village of Clinton

- Location in Rock County and the state of Wisconsin.
- Coordinates: 42°32′36″N 88°49′57″W
- Country: United States
- State: Wisconsin
- County: Rock

Area
  - Total: 35.4 sq mi (91.7 km^{2})
  - Land: 35.4 sq mi (91.6 km^{2})
  - Water: 0 sq mi (0.0 km^{2})
- Elevation: 950 ft (290 m)

Population (2020)
  - Total: 889
  - Density: 25.1/sq mi (9.71/km^{2})
- Time zone: UTC−6 (Central (CST))
  - Summer (DST): UTC−5 (CDT)
- Area code: 608
- FIPS code: 55-15650
- GNIS feature ID: 1582984
- Website: https://clintonwisconsin.com/

The Town of Clinton is a located in Rock County in the U.S. state of Wisconsin. The population was 889 at the 2020 census. The Village of Clinton is located in the town, though it is politically independent. The unincorporated community of Bergen is located in the town.

== Geography ==
According to the United States Census Bureau, the town has a total area of 35.4 square miles (91.7 km^{2}), of which 35.4 square miles (91.6 km^{2}) is land and 0.0 square mile (0.1 km^{2}) (0.06%) is water.

== Demographics ==
As of the census of 2000, there were 893 people, 308 households, and 248 families residing in the town. The population density was 25.2 people per square mile (9.7/km^{2}). There were 316 housing units at an average density of 3.4 persons/km^{2} (8.9 persons/sq mi). The racial makeup of the town was 96.98% White, 0.22% African American, 0.22% from other races, and 1.23% from two or more races. 1.34% of the population were Hispanic or Latino of any race were 1.34% of the population.

There were 308 households, out of which 36.4% had children under the age of 18 living with them, 70.8% were married couples living together, 4.2% had a female householder with no husband present, and 19.2% were non-families. 14.0% of all households were made up of individuals, and 5.8% had someone living alone who was 65 years of age or older. The average household size was 2.90 and the average family size was 3.20.

The age distribution of the population shows 26.8% under the age of 18, 9.1% from 18 to 24, 26.3% from 25 to 44, 28.2% from 45 to 64, and 9.6% who were 65 years of age or older. The median age was 37 years. For every 100 females, there were 113.6 males. For every 100 females age 18 and over, there were 107.0 males.

The median income for a household in the town was $55,324, and the median income for a family was $56,550. Males had a median income of $40,703 versus $24,375 for females. The per capita income for the town was $22,216. About 1.2% of the population and 2.9% of the population were below the poverty line, including 5.1% under the age of 18 and none 65 or older.

== History ==
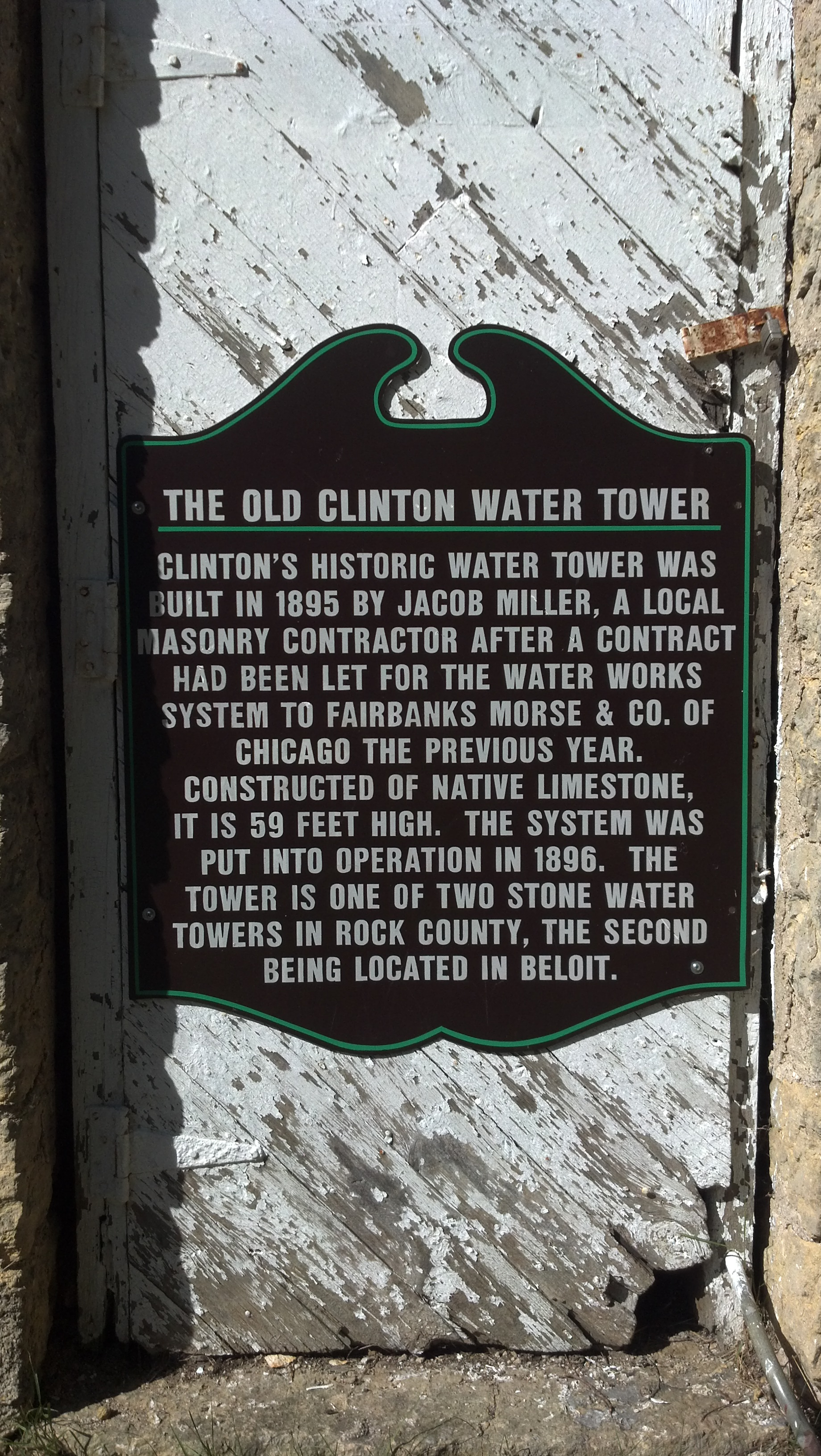
2013-09-15 Clinton Water Tower, High St., Clinton, WI

Near the south end of what is now Allen Street, is a historical site called "The Crossing" where two railroads "Chicago and Fond Du Lac" (known today as "C.+NW") and "Racine and Mississippi" (known today as "SOO Line") intersect. In 1856 the two companies raced to lay tracks so the other would have the expense of crossing the already established tracks.

The Old Clinton Water Tower built in 1895 is another historical site close to The Crossing.

== Notable people ==
- Robert T. Carey, Whig Representative, a member of the 1st Wisconsin Legislature in 1848
- Dustin Grow Cheever. Republican Representative 1872–1873
- John Conley, Republican Representative 1882–1883
- Samuel S. Jones, Republican Representative 1895–1896
- Ole Knudsen Nattestad, Norwegian-American pioneer immigrant settler, co-founder of the Jefferson Prairie Settlement
- Nig Perrine, baseball infielder who played primarily in the minor leagues, but was briefly (in 1907) a player for the Washington Senators, was born in Clinton
