= Temperance Town, Cardiff =

Temperance Town
- Temperance Town location within Cardiff
- Coordinates: 51.4770°N 3.1799°W
- Country: Wales
- City: Cardiff
- Established: 1850s

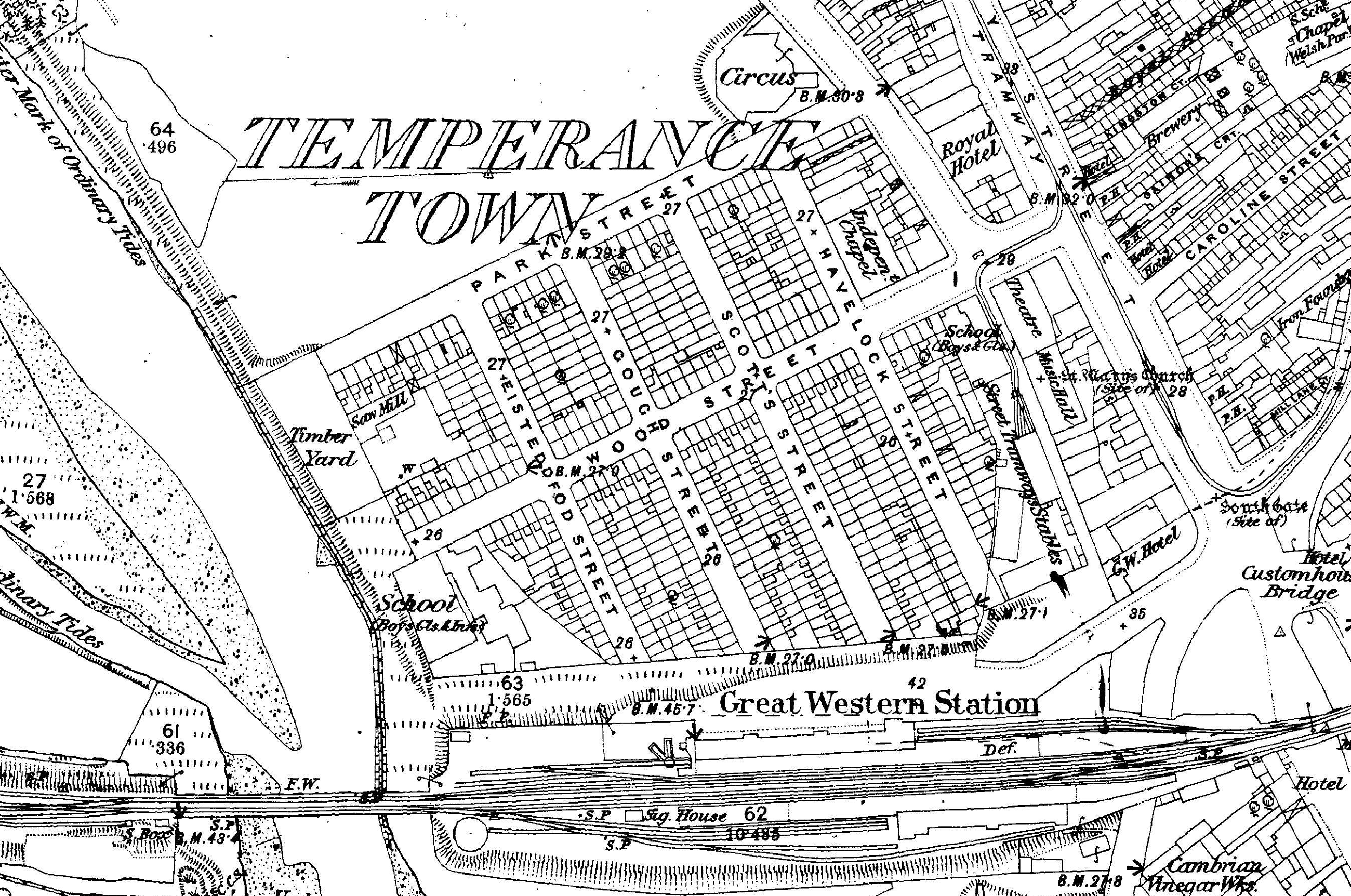
Ordnance Survey map of Temperance Town c.1875

Temperance Town, Cardiff, was the unofficial name for a working-class inner-city suburb established in the late 1850s and demolished in the 1930s to make way for Cardiff Bus Station.

== History ==
Temperance Town was built on reclaimed land next to the River Taff. The land was owned by Colonel Edward Wood, a teetotaller, who imposed a condition on the developer that the sale of alcohol would not be allowed - hence the district's name.

Development took place in the late 1850s and the early 1860s. Schools were opened in January 1879 and a church, St Dyfrig's, was built in 1888. The main street, Wood Street, was filled with shops and other businesses. The large Temperance Hall was eventually converted into the Wood Street Congregational Church.

In the early 20th century Cardiff's prosperity had been reduced by the decline in coal exports. Poverty and overcrowding in Temperance Town increased, and conditions deteriorated. In 1930 the Great Western Railway built a new station on the edge of the district and the railway company was concerned that the visible poverty of the district would affect its image and its business. It persuaded the Cardiff Corporation (the local authority) to improve the area; the Corporation (without consultation with the inhabitants) obtained the Cardiff Corporation Act 1934 to provide the necessary powers. The redevelopment plans included new public facilities such as a bus station.

The Corporation rehoused Temperance Town's residents elsewhere in better housing elsewhere in the city, and the district's demolition started in late 1937.

In the event World War II delayed redevelopment. The bus station opened in 1954; Wood Street was widened and lined with offices and shops. In 1958 a swimming pool, the Wales Empire Pool, was built for the British Empire and Commonwealth Games, in the same year.

== See also ==
- Temperance Towns, other settlements built by followers of the Temperance movement

== Sources ==
Fisk, Stephen (June 2009). "Abandoned Communities - Temperance Town".
