= Grant Tullar =

American minister

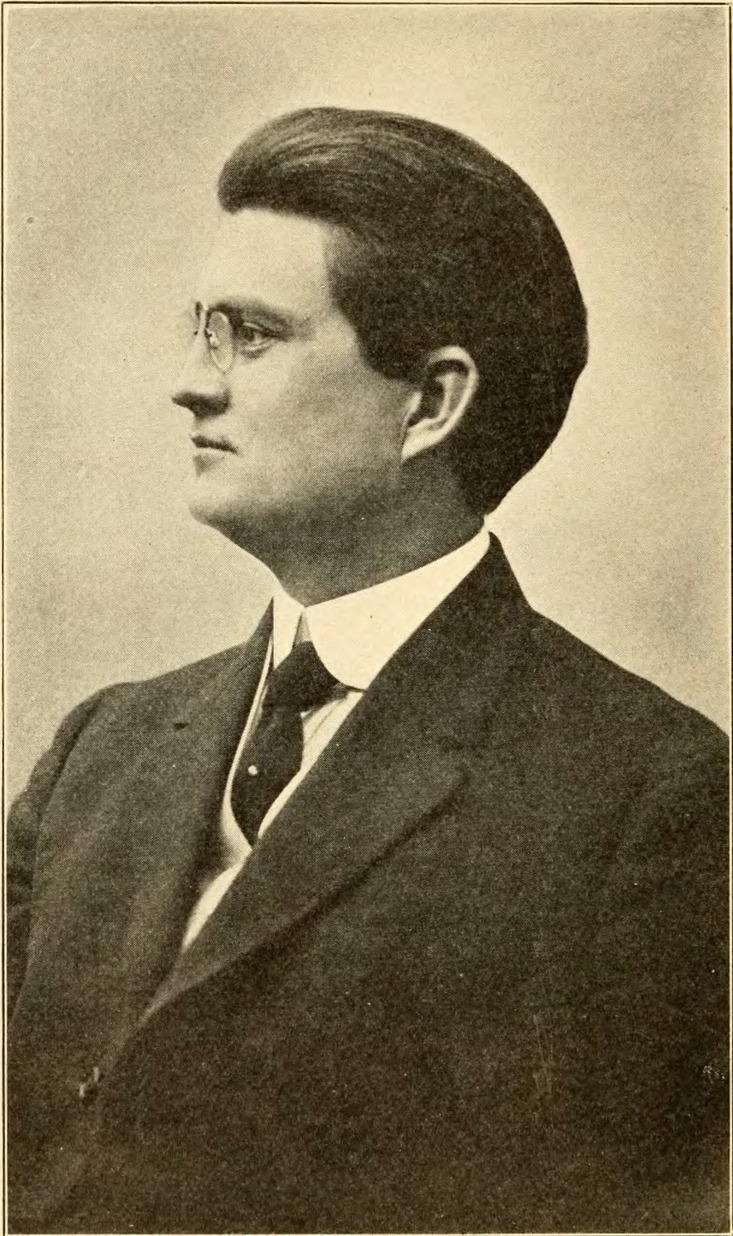
- Born: August 5, 1869; Bolton
- Died: May 20, 1950 (aged 80); Ocean Grove

Grant Colfax Tullar (August 5, 1869 – May 20, 1950) was an American minister, composer, and hymn writer.

Tullar was born on August 5, 1869, in Bolton, Connecticut. His parents named him after President Ulysses S. Grant and Vice President Schuyler Colfax. Tullar's mother died when he was two, and his father was disabled from the Civil War, so both of these factors contributed to a tumultuous childhood.

In 1888, Tullar became a Methodist at a camp meeting. From there, he attended Hackettstown Academy in New Jersey, going on to be a Methodist minister in Dover, Delaware. In 1893, with the help of Isaac Meredith, Tullar founded the Tullar-Meredith Publishing Company in New York City, where he composed and produced church and Sunday school music in hymns and hymnals.

Perhaps his most famous is the poem "The Weaver," commonly referred to as "The Tapestry Poem." Posthumously, this work gained popularity through the writings of Corrie ten Boom, who cited it as one of her favorites. In fact, the connection between Corrie ten Boom and this poem runs so deep that many people have mistakenly attributed the poem to her instead of Tullar.

Tullar died on May 20, 1950, in Ocean Grove, New Jersey, and he was buried in Restland Memorial Park in Hanover.
