= List of temperance towns =

Temperance Towns were settlements planned, financed, and populated by followers of the temperance movement of the late 19th century.

- Prohibition Park, New York (Staten Island), began as a summer colony for temperance followers in Manhattan and was financed by New York businessmen
- Vineland, New Jersey, was founded by Charles Kline Landis (1833–1900), a land developer from Philadelphia
- Harriman, Tennessee, was a land development founded by General Clinton B. Fisk (1828–1890), the Prohibition party presidential candidate in 1888 (Furnas 1965, 324–326)
- Palo Alto, California, was a temperance town begun by Mrs. Leland Stanford (1828–1905)
- Demorest, Georgia, was advertised in The Union Signal as a "city of refuge" from the problems of urban life.
- Temperance, Michigan, was named by two of its earliest settlers, Lewis and Martha Ansted. The Ansteds wrote restrictions into the deeds for all of the property they owned, specifying that alcohol could never be sold there. Other early settlers followed their lead. The restrictions lasted about 100 years, then were repealed on the initiative of a local businesswoman.
- Greeley, Colorado
- DeMoss Springs, Oregon, was founded in Sherman County Oregon by a musical family known as the DeMoss Concertists of Oregon and later the DeMoss Family Bards. The family donated 2.5 acres of its 800-acre temperance homestead to Sherman County in 1921, as DeMoss Springs Memorial Park. DeMoss Springs Park remains today, as the only county park in Sherman County.
- Harvey, Illinois, was founded in 1891 by Christian leader Turlington W. Harvey
- Cleveland, Minnesota, was historically a temperance town consistently voting "No License" toward saloons in town.
- Temperance Town, Cardiff, Wales, a suburb near the centre of Cardiff built in the early 1860s and demolished in 1937–38.
- Lompoc, California, Founded in the Fall of 1874 as a temperance colony, every land deed included a clause prohibiting the sale or manufacture of liquor.
- Saskatoon, Canada was founded in the early 1880s as a temperance colony by the Ontario-based Temperance Colonization Society, using land grants provided by the Canadian government.
