= Lambert Packard =

American architect

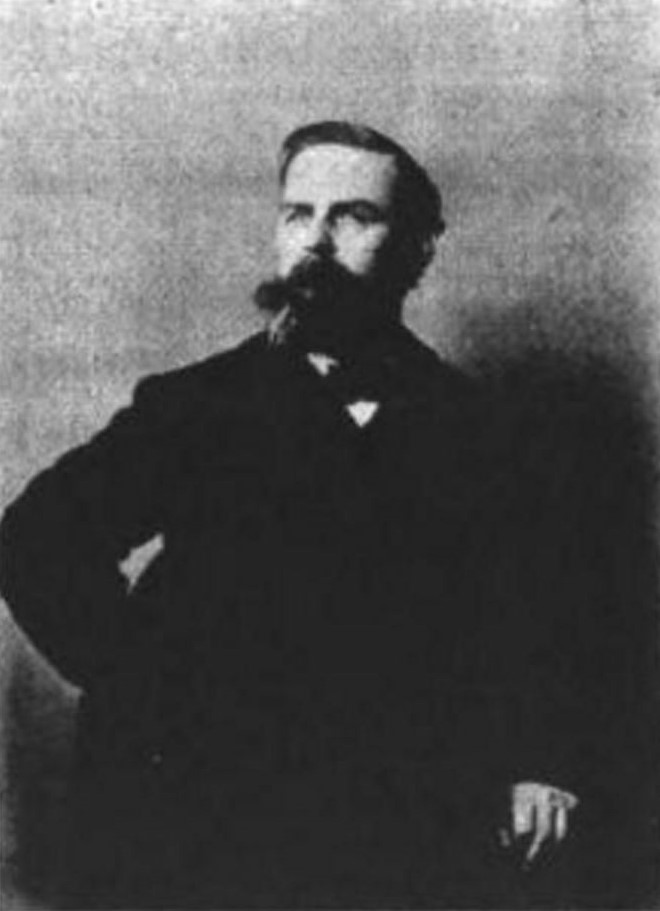
- Lambert Packard, 1904
- Born: 1832; Coventry, Vermont
- Died: 1906 (aged 73–74)
- Occupation: Architect
- Buildings: Underclyffe; North Congregational Church; Brantview; Orleans County Courthouse; Pinkerton Academy; Fairbanks Museum; New Avenue Hotel; St. John R. C. Church

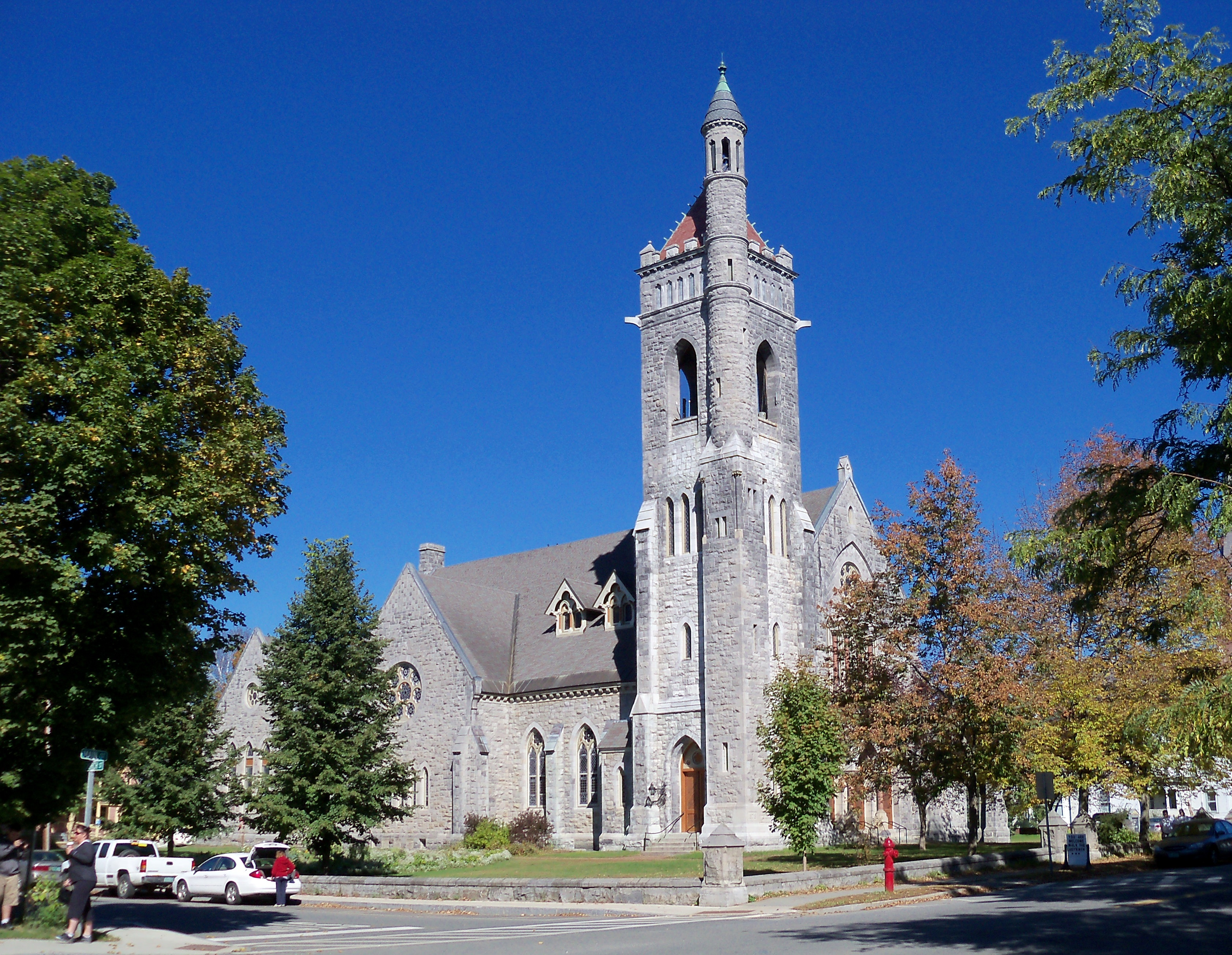
North Church, St. Johnsbury, 1877.

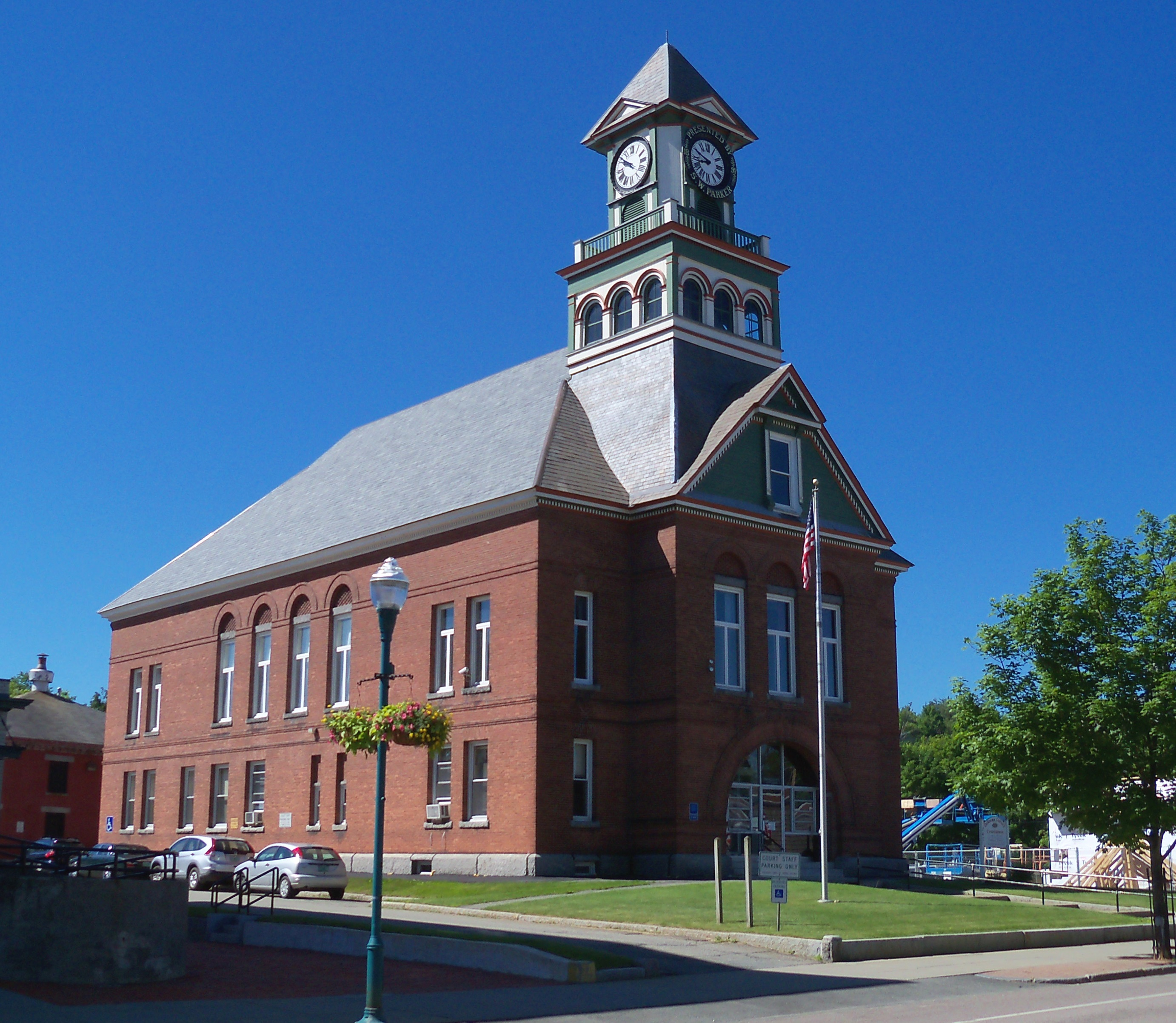
County Courthouse, Newport (1885)

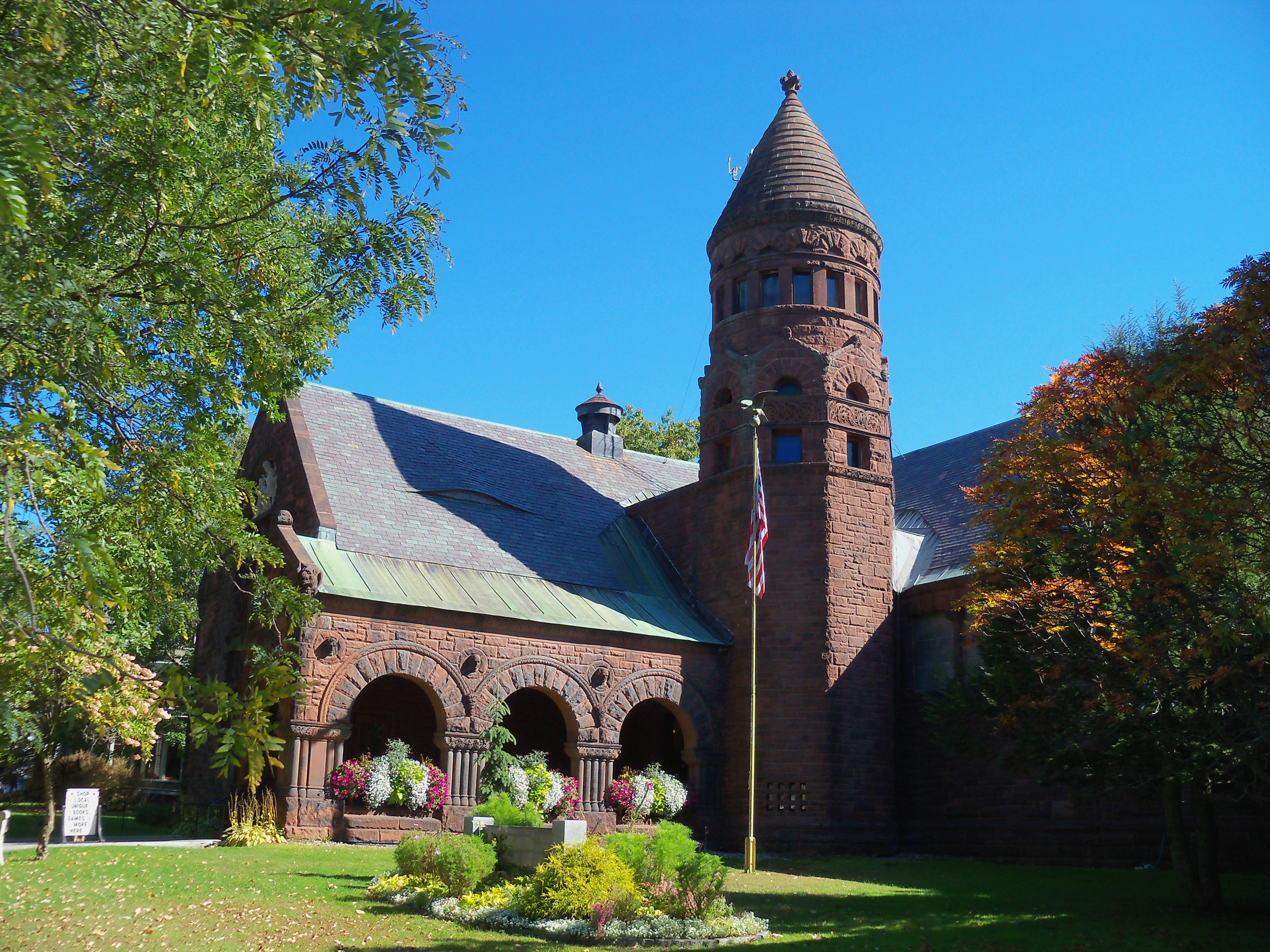
Fairbanks Museum, St. Johnsbury (1889)

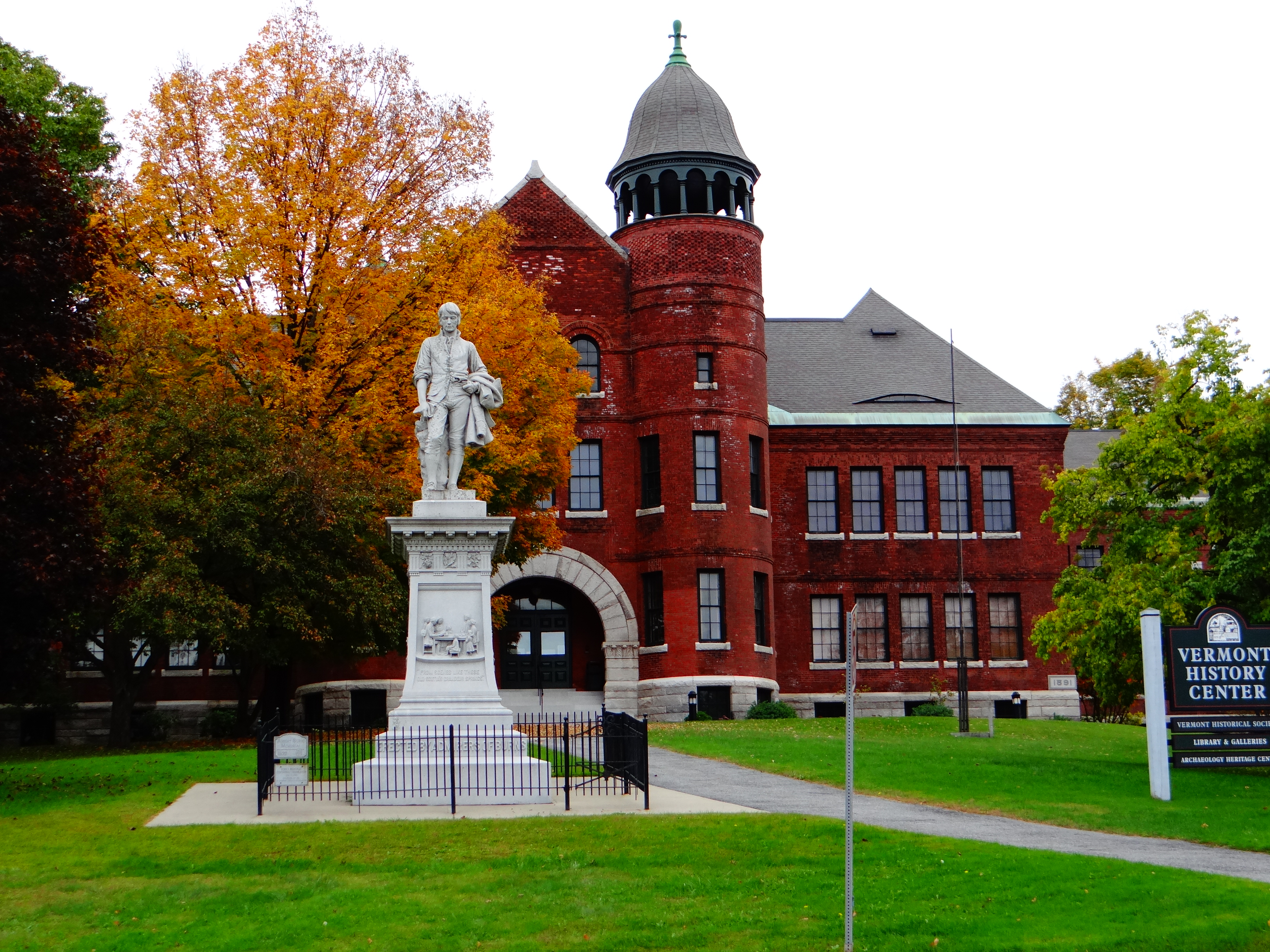
Spaulding High School, Barre (1890)

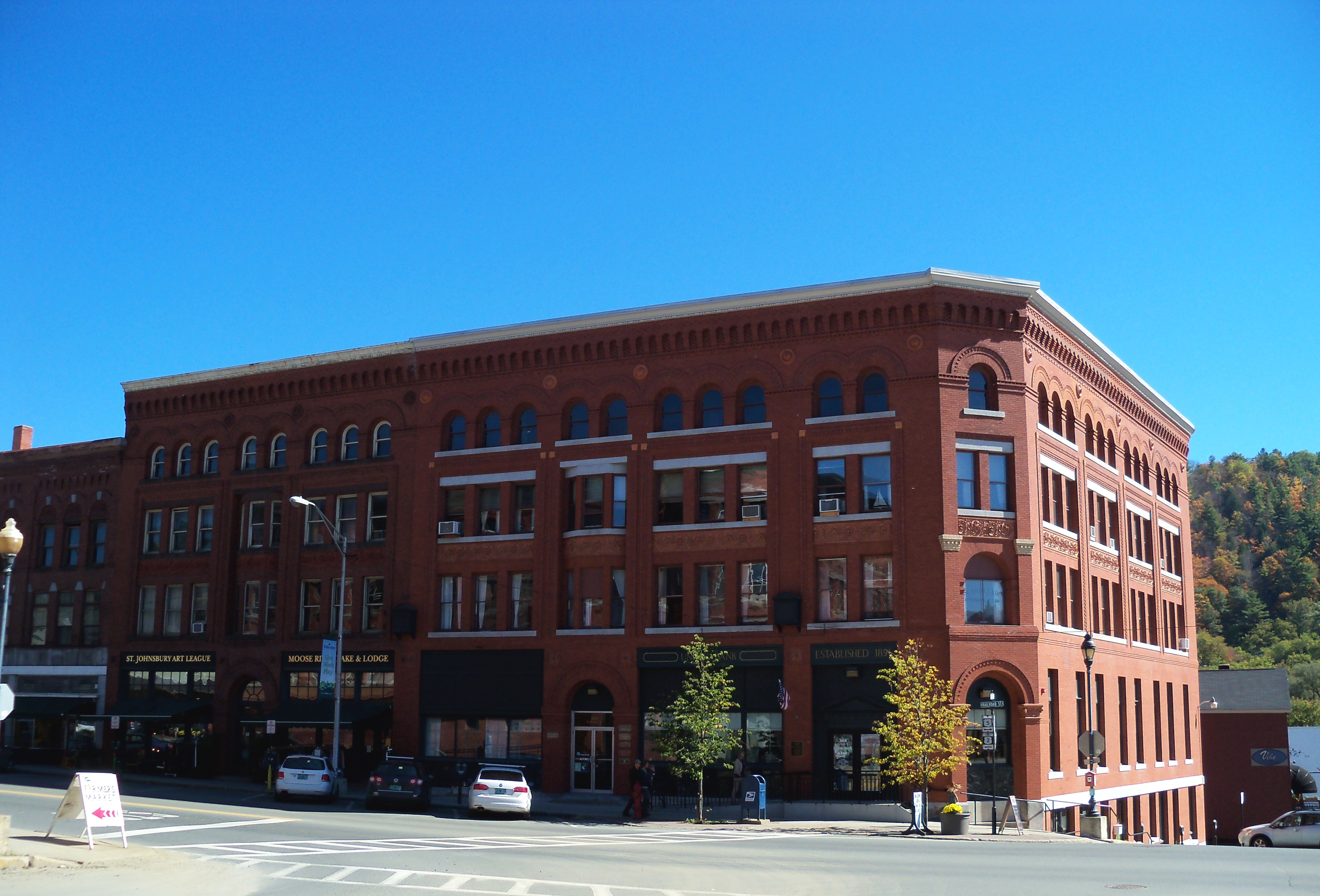
Citizens (r) and Merchants (l) Bank Buildings, St. Johnsbury (1893 and 1894)

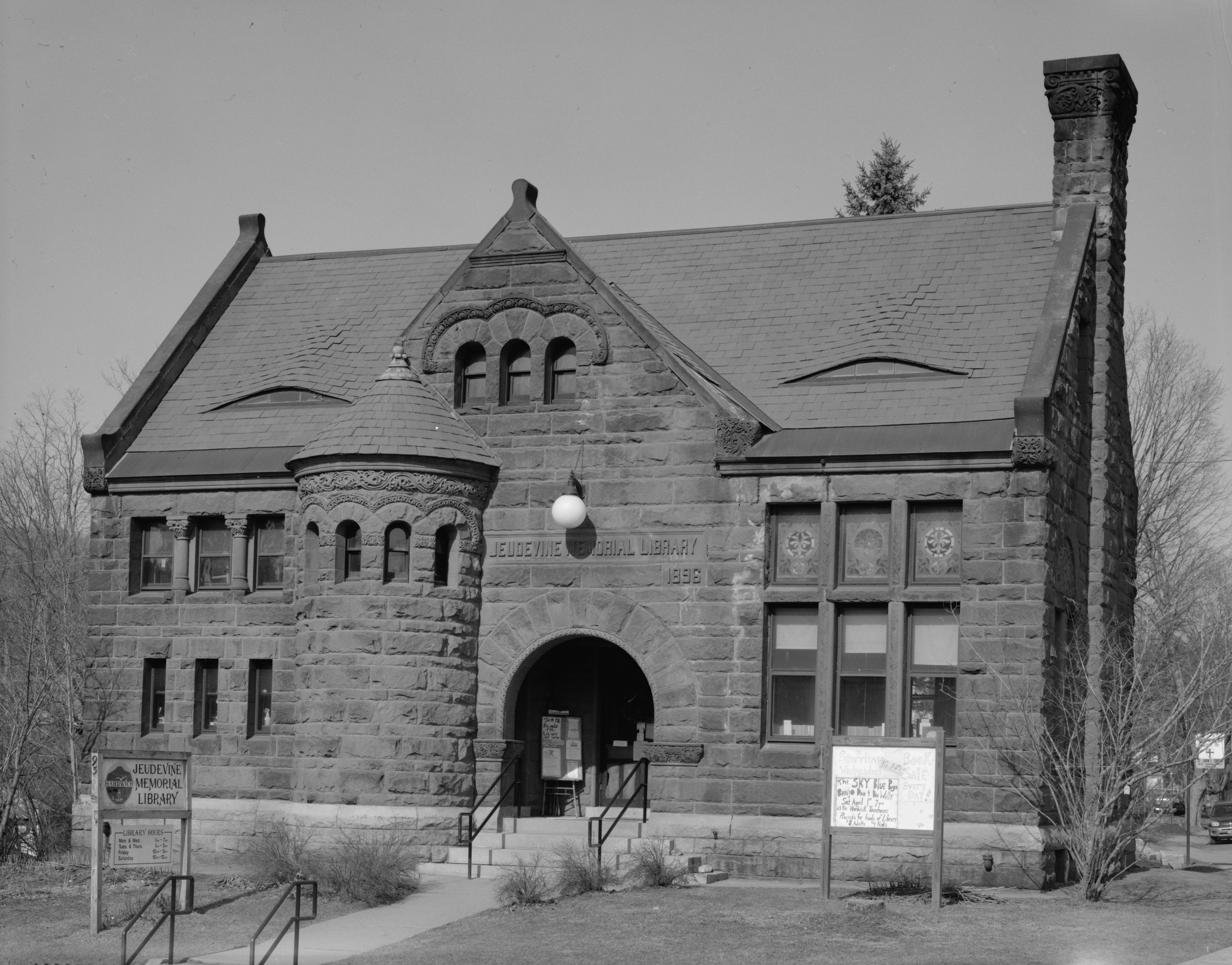
Memorial Library, Hardwick (1895)

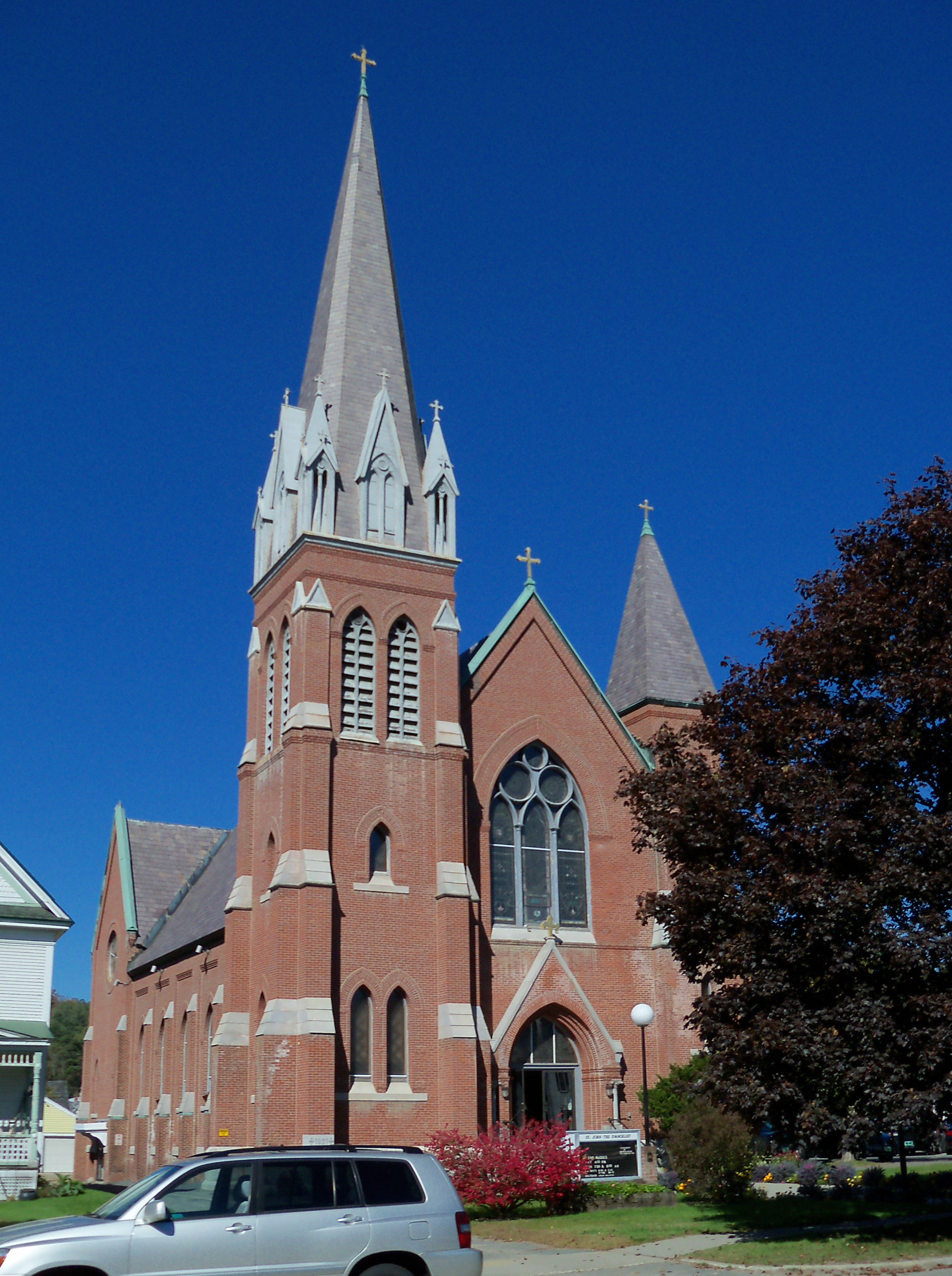
St. John Church, St. Johnsbury (1897)

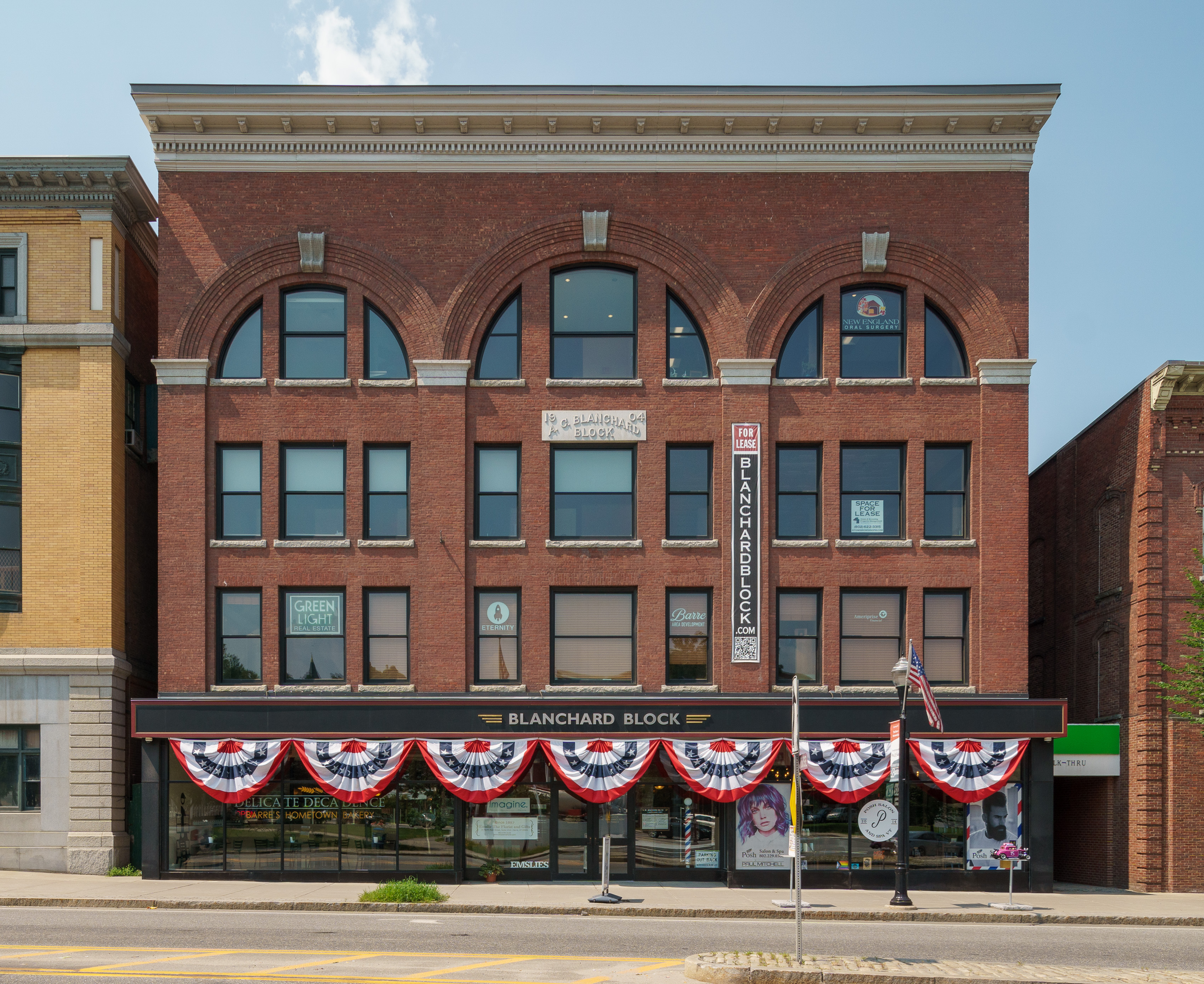
A. C. Blanchard Block, Barre (1904)

Lambert Packard (1832-1906) was an American architect from St. Johnsbury, Vermont.

== Life and career ==
He was born in 1832 Coventry, Vermont, to Jefferson Packard. The family moved to Waterford in 1847, where Packard learned the carpenter's trade. At age 15 he left home, working for engineers and architects in Lowell and Lawrence, Massachusetts. By the 1860s, he was in Boston working as a pattern maker. In 1866 he moved back to Vermont, having been employed as a foreman with E. & T. Fairbanks & Co. in St. Johnsbury. Before long, he also became company architect, and was in charge of all construction at the Fairbanks works. He developed a friendship with Franklin Fairbanks, who had been a partner in the firm since 1856, and served as its president from 1881 to 1895. Through the beneficence of the Fairbanks family, Packard designed most of the town's major buildings.

He worked alone until 1896, when he established a partnership with J. Albert Thorne of Montpelier. They parted ways soon after, but Packard established a new partnership, Packard & Tyrie, circa 1899. His last known commission came in 1904, and he died in 1906.

In 1862, Packard married Amanda F. Richardson of Lawrence, Massachusetts. They had three children, two sons and a daughter.

== Legacy ==
A number of his works are listed on the U.S. National Register of Historic Places.

== Architectural works ==
=== Lambert Packard, before 1896 ===
- 1870 - Bank Block, 1194 Main St, St. Johnsbury, Vermont
- 1870 - South (Fuller) Hall, St. Johnsbury Academy, St. Johnsbury, Vermont
  - Demolished.
- 1871 - Franklin Fairbanks House (Underclyffe), Underclyffe Rd, St. Johnsbury, Vermont
  - Demolished.
- 1872 - North (Colby) Hall, St. Johnsbury Academy, St. Johnsbury, Vermont
  - Demolished.
- 1872 - Universalist Church of the Messiah, 47 Cherry St, St. Jonsbury, Vermont
  - Largely demolished in 1972.
- 1873 - Edward T. Fairbanks House (Sheepcote), 67 Fairbanks Dr, St, Johnsbury, Vermont
  - Presently a dormitory of St. Johnsbury Academy.
- 1873 - I. O. O. F. Block, 336 Railroad St, St. Johnsbury, Vermont
- 1877 - North Congregational Church, 1325 Main St, St. Johnsbury, Vermont
- 1883 - Y. M. C. A. Building, Eastern Ave near Main, St. Johnsbury, Vermont
  - Burned.
- 1884 - William P. Fairbanks House (Brantview), 1000 Main St, St. Johnsbury, Vermont
- 1885 - Masonic Block, 1262 Main St, St. Johnsbury, Vermont
  - Burned in 2009.
- 1885 - Orleans County Courthouse, 274 Main St, Newport, Vermont
- 1885 - Passumpsic Savings Bank Building, 1236 Main St, St. Johnsbury, Vermont
- 1886 - Pinkerton Academy, 5 Pinkerton St, Derry, New Hampshire
- 1888 - Hanover Inn, 2 E Wheelock St, Hanover, New Hampshire
  - Remodeled in 1902, and demolished in 1966.
- 1888 - Lane & Davis Block, Main St, Newport, Vermont
  - Demolished.
- 1888 - Charles H. Stevens House, 1525 Main St, St. Johnsbury, Vermont
- 1889 - Fairbanks Museum, 1302 Main St, St. Johnsbury, Vermont
- 1890 - Bartlett Hall, Dartmouth College, Hanover, New Hampshire
- 1890 - Hotel Low, 114 S Main St, Bradford, Vermont
  - Demolished in 1960.
- 1890 - Pythian Block, 196 Eastern Ave, St. Johnsbury, Vermont
  - Home to Packard's office.
- 1890 - Spaulding High School (former), 60 Washington St, Barre, Vermont
- 1892 - Fairbanks Block, 1197 Main St, St. Johnsbury, Vermont
- 1892 - Lane's Block, 8 Field Ave, Newport, Vermont
  - Burned in 1923.
- 1893 - Merchants National Bank Building, 370 Railroad St, St. Johnsbury, Vermont
- 1894 - Citizens Savings Bank Building, 364 Railroad St, St. Johnsbury, Vermont
- 1894 - Hotel Lyndon, 76 Depot St, Lyndonville, Vermont
  - Burned in 1924, replaced by the Darling Inn.
- 1894 - Woods Library Building, 21 S Main St, Bradford, Vermont
- 1895 - Jeudevine Memorial Library, 93 N Main St, Hardwick, Vermont
- 1895 - Lyndonville Savings Bank Building, 1033 Broad St, Lyndonville, Vermont
  - Demolished in 1962.
- 1895 - Passumpsic Baptist Church, 4544 U. S. 5, Passumpsic, Vermont
- 1895 - St. Johnsbury Hospital (former), 90 Prospect St, St. Johnsbury, Vermont
- 1895 - Temperance P. Reed House, 890 McGoff Hill, Lyndonville, Vermont
- 1896 - Julia Pettigrew Hutchins House (Remodeling), 261 Park Ave, Lyndonville, Vermont
- 1896 - New Avenue Hotel, 10 Eastern Ave, St. Johnsbury, Vermont

=== Packard & Thorne, 1896-1898 ===
- 1897 - St. John R. C. Church, 49 Winter St, St. Johnsbury, Vermont
- 1898 - Superintendent's House, St. Johnsbury Federal Fish Culture Station, 374 Emerson Falls Rd, St. Johnsbury, Vermont

=== Lambert Packard, 1898-c.1899 ===
- 1898 - Currier Block, 185 N Main St, Barre, Vermont
  - Burned in 1903.

=== Packard & Tyrie, c.1899 ===
- 1899 - Portland Street School, 510 Portland St, St. Johnsbury, Vermont

=== Lambert Packard, before 1906 ===
- 1903 - Barn, West View Farm, Waterford Hwy. 34, Waterford, Vermont
- 1904 - A. C. Blanchard Block, 14 N Main St, Barre, Vermont
