= Chocolate box (disambiguation) =

Chocolate box may refer to:

- Chocolate box art, an art genre
- "Chocolate Box", a song by Bros from The Time
- "Chocolate Box", a song by Prince from Lotusflower
- The Chocolate Box, a short story by Agatha Christie
- Buddha and the Chocolate Box, an album by Cat Stevens
- The Chocolate Box, an Australian chocolate maker

== See also ==
- Chocolate
