= Spaulding High School (Barre, Vermont) =

Location
- 155 Ayers Street; Barre, Vermont; United States; 44.189367°N 72.49298°W

Information
- Type: Public secondary
- Established: 1890
- School district: Barre Unified Union School District
- Principal: Denise Maurice
- Staff: 57.00 (FTE)
- Grades: 9–12
- Enrollment: 610 (2024–25)
- Student to teacher ratio: 10.70
- Team name: Crimson Tide
- Website: www.spauldinghs.org

Spaulding High School is a public high school at 155 Ayers Street in Barre, Vermont, serving grades 9–12 for Barre City and Barre Town as part of the Barre Unified Union School District. The school traces its founding to 1890 and is named for Jacob Shedd Spaulding, longtime principal of the Barre Academy. It shares its campus with the Central Vermont Career Center, and its athletic teams are known as the Crimson Tide.

== History ==
Spaulding High School is named for Jacob Shedd Spaulding (1811–1880), principal of the private Barre Academy from 1852 until his death in 1880. The academy occupied the Washington Street site from 1852 until 1885, when it closed. State Act 258 was approved on November 28, 1888. The academy's trustees subsequently transferred the property to the city for construction of a new school.

The city built the Spaulding Graded School on the old academy site, to a design by St. Johnsbury architect Lambert Packard. Its cornerstone was laid on August 15, 1891, and the building was dedicated in September 1892. It originally held both high school and younger students. By 1895, as the lower grades moved to other schools, the building served grades 9–12 and was renamed Spaulding High School. An addition with six classrooms, an auditorium and a gymnasium was built in 1914. The building is now known as the Spaulding School Building.

On November 2, 1962, Barre voters approved a new high school. It was built on Ayers Street, on the site of a former trotting field, and was dedicated on February 7, 1965, under principal Anatole G. Pendo; Deane C. Davis, who later became governor, spoke at the dedication. The old Washington Street building then served grades 6–8 until 1995, when Barre consolidated its neighborhood schools. The Vermont Historical Society bought the vacant building in 2000 and opened it as the Vermont History Center in 2002. The school describes itself as "the oldest and longest-operating high school in Vermont."

== Campus ==
The Ayers Street campus also houses the Central Vermont Career Center, a regional technical education center that enrolls students from Spaulding and from other area high schools.

== Academics ==
Spaulding offers Advanced Placement courses, dual enrollment and early college options, as well as career and technical programs at the Central Vermont Career Center. Spaulding graduated 130 students in 2026; principal Denise Maurice said more than half of that class had taken part in dual enrollment or early college, or had studied at a technical center.

== Extracurricular activities ==
Spaulding has a Junior Reserve Officers' Training Corps (JROTC) program.

The Spaulding Theatre Group stages student productions, such as an adaptation of Dracula in December 2024. The school's music ensembles include a chorus, which took part in a 2024 statewide student choral concert, and a popular-music ensemble, The Tones, which performs benefit concerts. Spaulding hosted the 97th Vermont All-State Music Festival in May 2024.

== Athletics ==
Spaulding's teams, the Crimson Tide, compete in Vermont Principals' Association championships. The division varies by sport.

=== State championships ===
The school has won state championships in the following sports:

- Boys' basketball - 1932, 1934, 1938, 1945, 1950, 1951, 1961, 1962, 1963, 1964, 1994, 2002
- Wrestling - 1992, 1995, 1998, 1999 (Division II), 1976, 1977, 1978, 1984, 2026 (Division I)
- Baseball - 1958, 1959, 1962, 1965, 1970, 1990, 2022 (Division II)
- Boys' ice hockey - 1969, 1970, 1980, 1996, 1997, 2010
- Field hockey - 1983, 1989, 1991, 1992, 1997
- Football (Division II) - 2007, 2008, 2009, 2010
- Softball - 1987, 1990, 1999
- Girls' ice hockey - 2020 (Division II), 2023 (Division I)
- Boys' golf - 1995, 1996
- Girls' basketball - 2009
- Girls' soccer - 2001

=== Recent championships ===
- the 2020 Division II girls' ice hockey title, won with a 22–0 season
- the 2022 Division II baseball title, the program's first in 32 years
- the 2023 Division I girls' ice hockey title, the school's first Division I title in any sport since 2010
- the 2026 Division I wrestling title

=== 2026 wrestling championship ===
In 2026 the wrestling team won the state championship. It scored 236.5 points to 195 for Mount Anthony Union High School, ending Mount Anthony's 36-year run of consecutive state titles, a national record. It was Spaulding's first wrestling title since 1984 and its fifth overall. The team was coached by Darren O'Meara, whom the National Wrestling Coaches Association (NWCA) had named Vermont boys' head coach of the year in 2019 and 2022, and Section 1 (Northeast) head coach of the year in 2022. It had been runner-up to Mount Anthony several times, including by 13 points in 2009 and by 5.5 points in 2022. Spaulding's assistant coaches, Taylor Lozier, Trevor Bell, Hunter Quero, Nick Pierce, Mick Kerin and Matthew Thurston, were named the NWCA's 2026 Section 1 Boys Assistant Coaching Staff of the Year for the championship season.

Wrestlers who placed at the 2026 state championship:

- Wesley Churchill (106 lb, 1st), Lucas Colby (113 lb, 2nd), Grady Thurston (126 lb, 5th), Gavin Winnie (138 lb, 6th), Michael Grasso (144 lb, 2nd), James Marcellus (150 lb, 3rd), Logan Slater (157 lb, 3rd), Noah Dunster (165 lb, 1st), Caleb Hoar (175 lb, 2nd), Maxwell LaPerle (190 lb, 1st), Charlie Berry (215 lb, 2nd), and Alex Poczobut (285 lb, 6th).

== Notable faculty ==
- Paul N. Poirier, social studies and physical education teacher.
- Fred Swan, mathematics teacher.
- Arthur Zorn, music teacher.

== Notable alumni ==
- David Ball (2002), football wide receiver who broke Jerry Rice's NCAA Division I-AA record for career touchdown receptions at the University of New Hampshire, played in the National Football League with the Chicago Bears, New York Jets,, and the Philadelphia Eagles. He was inducted into the Vermont Sports Hall of Fame in 2024.
- Thom Lauzon, mayor of Barre City (2006–2018 and 2024–2026)
- Scott Milne (1977), Republican nominee for Governor of Vermont in 2014, and US Senate in 2016.
- Phil Scott (1976), 82nd Governor of Vermont (2017–present).
- James F. Milne (1968), Secretary of State of Vermont.
- Layne Higgs, basketball player on Spaulding's 1961 and 1962 state championship teams, University of Vermont standout and longtime St. Johnsbury Academy coach; inducted into the Vermont Sports Hall of Fame in 2019
- Donald Milne (1952), longtime clerk of the Vermont House of Representatives.
- Alexander V. Acebo, Vermont Auditor of Accounts (1970–1993).
- Madelyn Davidson (1931), first woman to serve as Vermont State Treasurer (1968–1969).
- Charles Poletti (1920), Governor of New York (December 1942).
- Steve Slayton (1920), pitcher for the 1928 Boston Red Sox.
- Louis "Crip" Polli (attended), Major League Baseball pitcher (1932, 1944), recognized as the first Italian-born major league player
- Deane C. Davis (1918), 74th Governor of Vermont (1969–1973).
- Lena Giudici (1917), one of Vermont's first female attorneys
- Edna Beard (1896), first woman to serve in Vermont House of Representatives, and first to serve in Vermont Senate.
