= St. Johnsbury Main Street Historic District =

Historic district in Vermont, United States

- U.S. National Register of Historic Places
- U.S. Historic district

- Location within Vermont Location within the United States
- Location: Area along Main St. including intersecting streets, St. Johnsbury, Vermont
- Coordinates: 44°25′6″N 72°1′14″W
- Area: 75 acres (30 ha)
- Architectural style: Mid 19th Century Revival, Late Victorian
- NRHP reference No.: 75000238
- Added to NRHP: May 28, 1975

The St. Johnsbury Main Street Historic District encompasses the historic civic and cultural center of the town of St. Johnsbury, Vermont. Organized along the town's Main Street, it includes high-quality architecture spanning the 19th and early 20th centuries, and includes the National Historic Landmark St. Johnsbury Athenaeum. Many of the district's buildings were designed by Lambert Packard, a prominent local architect. The district was listed on the National Register of Historic Places in 1975, and was enlarged slightly in 1976. It was subsumed into the larger St. Johnsbury Historic District in 1980.

== Description and history ==
The town of St. Johnsbury was settled in the late 18th century, and was at first organized primarily on a high terrace above the Passumpsic River, where its Main Street is now located. This area developed as a residential and civic hub, with some commercial development, in the first half of the 19th century. The arrival of railroad lines in the 19th century prompted major development in the "lower district", now Railroad Street, as a commercial center organized around the railroads. The Main Street area retained its civic importance, and is where the town hall and the county facilities of Caledonia County are located.

The historic district extends along Main Street, from Mt. Pleasant Street in the north to Vine Street in the south. It includes a small residential area bounded by Vine, Main, and Barker Streets and Western Avenue, and also on Prospect Street. The northern end of the district is anchored by a small triangular park, and is predominantly residential. South of Winter Street there are a cluster mainly religious buildings, including the Fairbanks Museum and Planetarium. At the junctions with Western and Eastern Avenues (signed United States Route 2) there are a few commercial buildings, the town hall and county courthouse, and the St. Johnsbury Athenaeum, built in 1875 and one of the nation's oldest unaltered museums. South of the Western Avenue junction, where there is also a small triangular park with a Victorian fountain, is a small residential area characterized by high-quality large-scale homes, including some built by members of the locally prominent Fairbanks family, owners of the Fairbanks Scale Works, the town's largest employer in the late 19th century.

== See also ==
- National Register of Historic Places listings in Caledonia County, Vermont
