= Lena Giudici =

American lawyer

- Born: November 7, 1898; Barre, Vermont, U.S.
- Died: January 8, 1995 (aged 96); Barre, Vermont, U.S.
- Education: Boston University

Lena Giudici (/dʒʊˈdiːsi/ juu-DEE-see; November 7, 1898 – January 8, 1995) was an American lawyer and clubwoman. Giudici was the third woman admitted to the Vermont Bar Association (1921) and a member of the Massachusetts Bar Association (1920). She was active in civic and community affairs, serving on the board of the Office of Price Administration and presiding over the Vermont Federation of Professional and Business Women's Clubs.

== Biography ==
Giudici was born on November 7, 1898, in Barre, Vermont, the third of four children of Desiderio Z. Giudici and Carolina Carabelli Giudici, who were immigrants from Saltrio and Porto Ceresio in Northern Italy. Her father was a co-owner of Giudici Brothers, a granite carving business. Giudici graduated from Spaulding High School in 1917 and studied law and accounting at Boston University. She was admitted to the Massachusetts bar in 1920, and in 1921 became the third woman to be admitted to the Vermont bar, preceded by Jessie D. Bigwood (1902) and Ellen M. W. Hoar (1914).

At her family home in Barre, she opened a law practice and did accounting work for several granite businesses. She was also involved in public service on the local, state, and national levels. She sat on the board of the Office of Price Administration, which monitored prices and rents during World War II. She was president of the Vermont Federation of Business and Professional Women's Clubs, and treasurer from 1927 to 1929. She attended and spoke at Federation conferences, and organized the State Federation convention that was held in Barre in May 1929. She was also involved with the Kiwanis Club, the Women's Auxiliary Police, the Barre Women's Center, and other organizations.

Giudici died on January 8, 1995, in a nursing home in Barre. Her papers are on file with the Vermont Historical Society.
