= Zorn (surname) =

Zorn (German: [t͡sɔʁn]) is a surname of German origin. It is a cognominal surname, originating from the German word Zorn, meaning "wrath" or "anger".

Notable people with this surname include:

- Aleksander Zorn (born 1947), Slovene literary historian, editor and politician
- Alice Zorn, Canadian author
- Anders Zorn (1860–1920), Swedish painter
- Armand Zorn (born 1988), German politician
- Arthur Zorn (born 1954), American musician
- Bill Zorn (born 1947), American folk musician
- Charles Rudolph Zorn (1844–1916), American politician and farmer
- Claire Zorn, Australian writer
- Dale Zorn (born 1953), American politician
- Eberhard Zorn (born 1960), German army general
- Eduard Zorn (1901–1945), German Wehrmacht officer
- Eric Zorn (born 1958), American columnist, grandson of Max August Zorn
- Franz Zorn (born 1970), Austrian ice speedway rider
- Friedrich Albert Zorn (1816–1895), German dancer, choreographer and dance theorist
- Hans Zorn (1891–1943), German Wehrmacht general
- Jim Zorn (born 1953), former National Football League quarterback and head coach
- Johannes Zorn (1739–1799), German pharmacist, botanist, and botanical illustrator
- John Zorn (born 1953), American composer and saxophonist
- Julia Zorn (born 1990), German ice hockey player
- Ludwig Zorn (1865–1921), German painter
- Max August Zorn (1906–1993), German-born American mathematician
- Max Zorn (artist), Dutch-German artist
- Pete Zorn (1950–2016), American-born British musician
- Peter Zorn (1682–1746), German librarian and philologist
- Richard Zorn (1860–1945), German pomologist
- Sarah J. Zorn, American military commander
- Trischa Zorn (born 1964), American swimmer, most successful Paralympian of all time
- Werner Zorn (born 1942), German computer scientist
- Zac Zorn (born 1947), American swimmer
- Zorn (nobility)
  - François Zorn von Bulach (1828–1890), Alsatian politician
  - Franz Zorn von Bulach (1858–1925), auxiliary bishop of Strasbourg
  - Hugo Zorn von Bulach (1851–1921), Alsatian politician and member of the Reichstag
  - Wolf Christoph Zorn von Plobsheim (1665–1721), German Baroque architect

== See also ==
- Zorn (disambiguation)
