= St. Johnsbury Historic District =

Historic district in Vermont, United States

- U.S. National Register of Historic Places
- U.S. Historic district
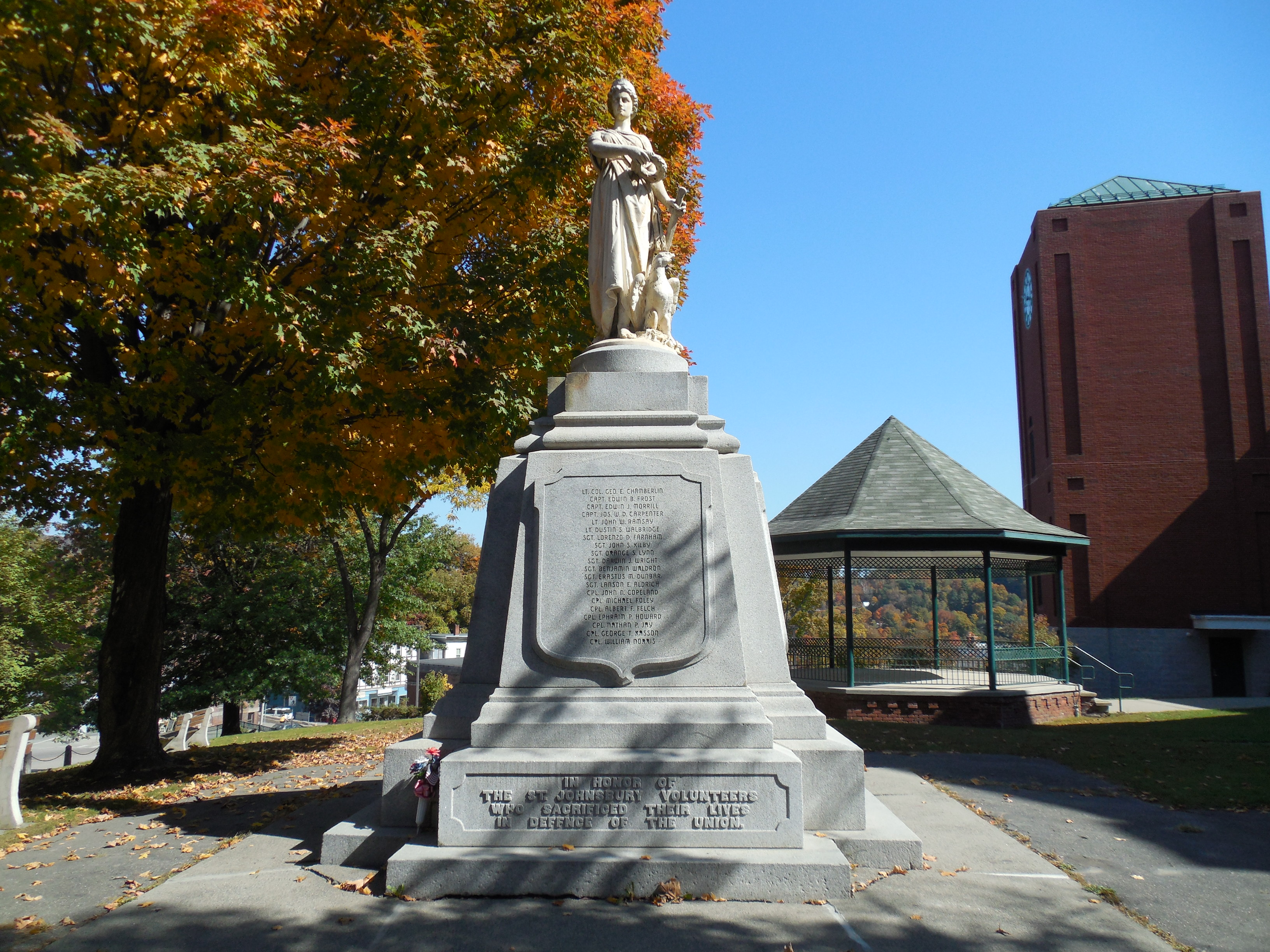
- Civil War Memorial

- Location within Vermont Location within the United States
- Location: U.S. 5 and U.S. 2, St. Johnsbury, Vermont
- Coordinates: 44°25′6″N 72°1′2″W
- Area: 3 acres (1.2 ha)
- Architectural style: Mid 19th Century Revival, Late Victorian
- NRHP reference No.: 80000424
- Added to NRHP: April 17, 1980

The St. Johnsbury Historic District encompasses much of the historic civic and commercial center of St. Johnsbury, Vermont. Representing a significant expansion of the Railroad Street Historic District and the St. Johnsbury Main Street Historic District, it captures the historical tension and competition between Main Street and Railroad Street for primacy as the town's most important civic and commercial areas. The district was listed on the National Register of Historic Places in 1980.

== Description and history ==
The town of St. Johnsbury was settled in the late 18th century, and was at first organized primarily on a high terrace above the Passumpsic River, where its Main Street is now located. This area developed as a residential and civic hub, with some commercial development, in the first half of the 19th century. The arrival of railroad lines in the 19th century prompted major development in the "lower district", now Railroad Street, as a commercial center organized around the railroads. During the second half of the 19th century this development competed with Main Street for economic primacy, and elements of a commercial corridor began to take grow on Eastern Avenue, the main through road between Main and Railroad Streets. Railroad Street benefited from the ongoing railroad activity, while Main Street benefited in no small measure from the activities of the Fairbanks family, whose Fairbanks Scale Works, located northwest of Main Street on the banks of the Sleepers River, was the town's largest employer.

The historic district is geographically roughly an H shape, reflecting its historical development. The eastern leg is Railroad Street, running north-south from Portland Street to Depot Square. This area includes the Railroad Street Historic District, centered on the junction of Railroad and Eastern, but is primarily extended to the north. The western leg is on Main Street, extending from Mt. Pleasant Street in the north to Vine Street in the south. These are joined by the main east-west through corridor, which includes Eastern Avenue between Main and Railroad, and extends west of Main on Western Avenue to Barker Street. The Railroad Street area has a fine collection of late 19th and early 20th-century commercial architecture, while the Main Street area is more diverse, with a large measure of housing and civic buildings. Fully one quarter of the buildings on Main Street were designed by a single architect, Lambert Packard, who also designed some of the buildings on Railroad Street and Eastern Avenue. The Main Street area is also home to two of St. Johnsbury's best-known institutions, the St. Johnsbury Atheneum, a National Historic Landmark, and the Fairbanks Museum and Planetarium; both of these were created through the philanthropy of the Fairbanks family.

Selected buildings in the district:

- Landry Block (1879), 103-107 Railroad Street, Italianate;
- Odd Fellows Block (1874), 109 Railroad St., Second Empire in style, designed by Lambert Packard;
- Masonic Temple (1912), Eastern Avenue, Neo-Classic-Revival in style, designed by F.A. Walker. Has two monumental Tuscan Doric pilasters supporting a full Doric entablature with dentils and modillions; has a pedimented portico.

== See also ==
- National Register of Historic Places listings in Caledonia County, Vermont
