= Leahy Library =

Coordinates: 44.19592°N 72.49835°W

Howard and Alba Leahy Library is located in the Vermont History Center in Barre, VT. It is housed in the old Spaulding School Building and run by the Vermont Historical Society, which is also located in the same building.

== About ==
The library was named after Howard and Alba Leahy, the parents of U.S. Senator Patrick Leahy. Senator Leahy helped secure funding to pay for some of the renovations of the Spaulding School building and in return the Vermont Historical Society named the library in his parents' honor.

The Howard and Alba Leahy Library is open to the public and allows for individualized research. Researchers can find a variety of resources documenting the history and people of Vermont, including a collection of books and pamphlets dating from the 1770s to the present. The past is preserved at the library in letters, diaries, ledgers and scrapbooks. The extensive photograph and broadside collections create a visual record of the state's past as well.

With a special interest in family history, the library has the largest printed genealogical collection in the state. It is also home to some of Vermont's earliest maps and planning documents. A catalog of most of the library's holdings is available online.

== History ==
In 2000, the Vermont Historical Society acquired the old Spaulding School in Barre, VT. It has since been renovated to house the Leahy library, collections storage and the administrative offices for Vermont Historical Society. In July 2002 the Society's library opened to the public on the second floor of the Vermont History Center.
