= Spaulding School Building =

Structure in Barre, Vermont, US

Coordinates: 44.19605°N 72.49828°W

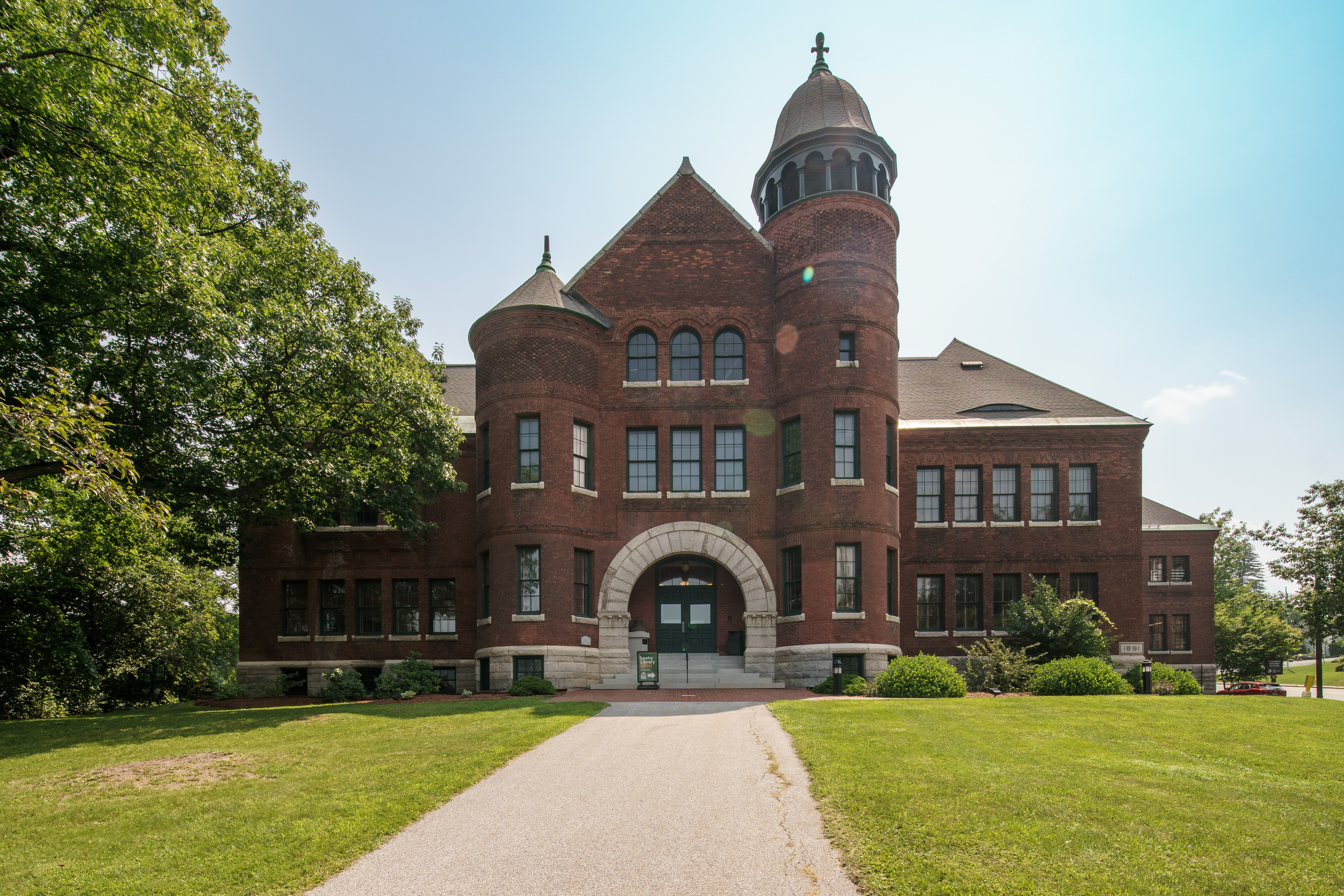
Spaulding School Building

The former Spaulding School Building is a historic structure that has overlooked the city of Barre, Vermont, United States, since 1891. It now houses the Vermont History Center, the home of the Vermont Historical Society.

== The building ==
The building was designed by Vermont architect and builder Lambert Packard (1832–1906). Trained by his father as a carpenter, Packard found employment as a draftsman and a pattern maker before becoming the carpenter foreman and later the company architect of E. and T. Fairbanks and Company in St. Johnsbury, Vermont.

Packard designed many of St. Johnsbury's notable buildings, including the Fairbanks Museum and the North Church. According to biographer Allen D. Hodgdon, "During his career, Packard was called upon to design practically ever kind of building known to the profession." He designed over 800 buildings during his Vermont career from 1866 to 1906.

The Spaulding School is Packard's interpretation of a popular mid-19th century architectural style known as Richardsonian Romanesque, named for the work of prominent Victorian architect Henry Hobson Richardson (1838–1881). Using red brick and local Barre gray granite, Packard referenced the weighty, polychromatic Romanesque style with large, round-arched entranceways, recessed windows with contrasting sills, carved capitals, and characteristic towers and turrets.

== Spaulding Graded School ==
The school was named for Jacob Shedd Spaulding (1811-1880), principal from 1852 to 1880 of the Barre Academy, the private school that occupied the site from 1852 to 1885. Spaulding was a graduate from Dartmouth College and a successful teacher at the Bakersfield Academy in Vermont before coming to Barre.

On August 15, 1891, former Academy graduate and Barre businessman Charles A. Smith declared the cornerstone, "a fine specimen of Barre granite," to be "well laid." The new school, dedicated in September 1892, contained nine large classrooms, a chapel, a chemical and physical laboratory, a library and two teachers' rooms; it housed high school and younger students.

As other schools were constructed around the city, the earlier grades moved out, leaving grades nine through twelve in the building that was renamed Spaulding High School in 1894. In order to serve Barre's expanding population, an annex containing six new classrooms, an auditorium and a gymnasium was authorized in 1914 and opened for the school year in 1915. In 1964, a new, larger high school building was constructed on Ayers Street, and the old school began to serve grades six through eight. In 1995, a new K-8 facility was built, consolidating the functions of the neighborhood schools scattered around the city. The Spaulding School building then stood vacant.

== Renovations ==
In 1996, the Vermont Historical Society, looking for a new building to house its collections and expand its services, approached the City of Barre about the possibility of using the empty school. In September 2000, the Historical Society purchased the old Spaulding building from the city for $1.00. Renovations began in October of that year. Architects for the renovations were Black River Design of Montpelier; the general contractor was H.P. Cummings Construction. The partially completed facility opened to the public on July 20, 2002.

The first phase of the renovation included finishing space for the Society's library on the second floor of the original building; offices, a book store and a meeting room on the first floor of the 1891 building; and library and museum collection storage vaults in the basement of the entire building.

Today, the first and second floor reception foyers feature the school's original wainscoting made of American chestnut, now an endangered species. Original pressed tin ceilings have been cleaned and restored and are visible throughout the 1891 building. In the library "stacks" room on the second floor, stained glass windows, hidden many years by a suspended ceiling, have been exposed and restored. In all, a little over half of the 60,000 foot space (two floors in the 1891 building and the entire basement) has been renovated for use by the Vermont Historical Society.

In December 2022, the Vermont Historical Society announced that it was the recipient of $210,000 as part of the FY23 omnibus spending bill secured by Senator Bernie Sanders, which would be used to renovate part of the building for an open storage facility to house collections items. Construction on the space was completed at the end of November 2023.
