= Charles F. Templeton =

American judge (1856–1913)

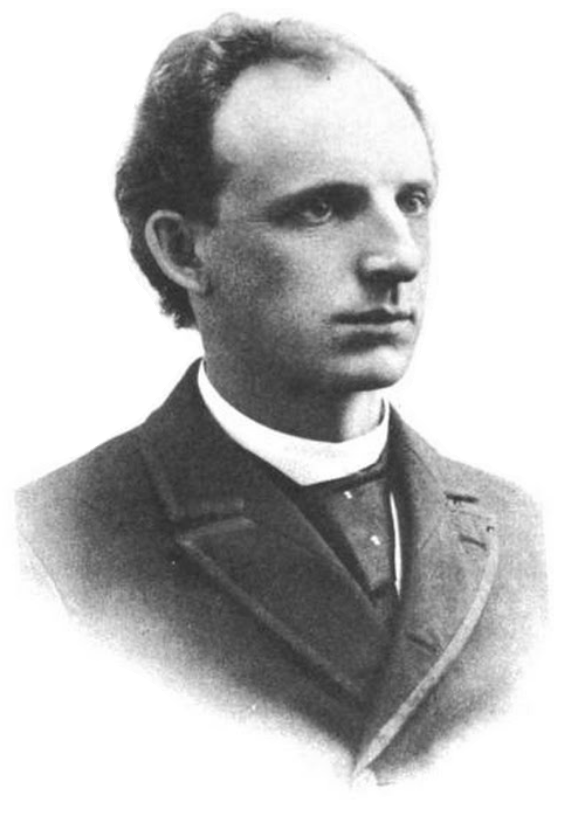
- Memorial photograph of Charles F. Templeton.

Justice of the Dakota Territorial Supreme Court
- In office 1888–1889
- Preceded by: Newly created seat
- Succeeded by: Seat abolished due to statehood

Attorney-General of the Dakota Territory
- In office March 12, 1887 – November 10, 1888
- Governor: Louis K. Church

Judge of the First Judicial District of North Dakota
- In office 1889–1896
- In office 1907–1913

Personal details
- Born: June 21, 1856 Worcester, Vermont, U.S.
- Died: January 3, 1913 (aged 56) Saint Paul, Minnesota, U.S.
- Spouse: Edna C. Carleton
- Education: Barre Academy, Dartmouth College
- Occupation: Attorney, Judge

Charles F. Templeton (June 21, 1856 – January 3, 1913) was an Attorney-General of the Dakota Territory and a justice of the Dakota Territorial Supreme Court from 1888 to 1889, and an attorney and judge in the Dakotas following their admission to statehood.

== Early life and education ==
Born in Worcester, Washington County, Vermont, Templeton was of English descent, his ancestors being among the early colonists of New England. He graduated first in his class from the Barre Academy at Barre, Vermont, on June 10, 1874. He then entered Dartmouth College, where he "was quite prominent in athletics, taking numerous prizes", graduating on June 27, 1878, and thereafter reading law in the office of S. C. Shurtleff to gain admission to the bar in Montpelier, Vermont, on December 6, 1880.

== Career in the Dakotas ==
In March 1881, he took up his residence in Fargo, Dakota Territory, having traveled there with businessman George B. Clifford. Templeton entered into a law partnership with Burleigh F. Spalding, and practiced law there until November 1888, when he moved to Grand Forks. On March 12, 1887, he was appointed Attorney-General of Dakota by Territorial Governor Louis K. Church. He resigned on November 10, 1888, following his appointment by President Grover Cleveland as an associate justice of the Dakota Territorial Supreme Court, alongside Louis W. Crofoot, on October 9, 1888. At that time, justices represented districts of the territory, and Templeton was appointed to the Eighth Judicial District. He remained in this office until November 2, 1889, with the admission of North and South Dakota to statehood. At the first election for state officers in 1889, he was elected Judge of the First Judicial District in North Dakota, covering the Grand Forks area. He was reelected in 1892, serving until his retirement in 1896.

He resumed the practice of law in Grand Forks until 1907, when Governor John Burke appointed Templeton to again serve as Judge of the First Judicial District of North Dakota. Templeton was re-elected in 1908 and 1912, and served in that capacity until his death.

== Personal life ==
Templeton married Edna C. Carleton at Williamstown, Vermont on February 28, 1881. He died in Saint Paul, Minnesota, having gone there for medical attention. He left a widow, three daughters, and one son.

Political offices
Preceded by Newly created seat	Justice of the Dakota Territorial Supreme Court; 1888–1889	Succeeded by Seat abolished due to statehood
