= Zorn =

Zorn may refer to:

== People ==
- Zorn (surname), including a list of people with this name
- Zorn (nobility), Alsatian noble family
- Zorn, fictional character appearing in Marvel comics books, see Xorn

== Places ==
- Zorn, Texas, unincorporated community
- Zorn (river), river in northeastern France
- Zorn Formation, geologic formation in France

== Other ==
- Zorn Collections, museum in Sweden
- Zorn Badge, award given to folk musicians in Sweden
- Zorn 88, former Norwegian neo-Nazi group
- Zorn ring, mathematical concept
- Zorn's lemma, mathematical proposition
- Zorns Lemma, 1970 film by Hollis Frampton
- Son of Zorn, American animated/live action hybrid sitcom
- Van Zorn, 1914 comedy by Edwin Arlington Robinson
