= Fred Swan =

American painter

- Born: United States
- Education: United States Naval Academy
- Known for: Landscape paintings

Fred Swan is an American painter who resides in Barre, Vermont. He graduated from the United States Naval Academy, and then taught mathematics at Spaulding High School.

A self-taught artist, Swan is best known for his comforting, warm landscapes which take up to 500 hours to complete. Typical of these is Blue Moon, which, as with many of Swan's paintings, features houses and is highly detailed but could be criticised for an idealised, "chocolate box" style.

Swan's paintings are highly commercial and have been adapted for calendars and jigsaw puzzles and are sold as prints.

Swan won the 1979 Saturday Evening Post Cover Contest, and his art is featured in several famous collections, including those of Johnson and Johnson, Malcolm Forbes, and the Vermont Council on the Arts. His paintings have also been featured in Yankee Magazine and Vermont Life Magazine.
