= The Chocolate Box (company) =

Australian chocolate maker

The Chocolate Box Enterprises
- Industry: Confectionery production
- Founded: 1958
- Founder: Richard Adler and Rose Adler
- Headquarters: Melbourne, Australia
- Number of locations: 10
- Area served: Australia
- Key people: Paul Ryan (owner and managing director)
- Products: Food and Beverage (Chocolate)
- Number of employees: 50 (2007)
- Website: chocolatebox.com.au

The Chocolate Box Enterprises is an Australian chocolate maker based in Melbourne. Founded in 1958 in Camberwell by the Jewish Australian Adler family, the Chocolate Box is a family-owned business that sells gourmet chocolates and confectionary. A majority of The Chocolate Box's range is Australian made.

In 2007 it employed 50 staff, which dropped to 38 in 2021, and had a turn over of $5.5 million.

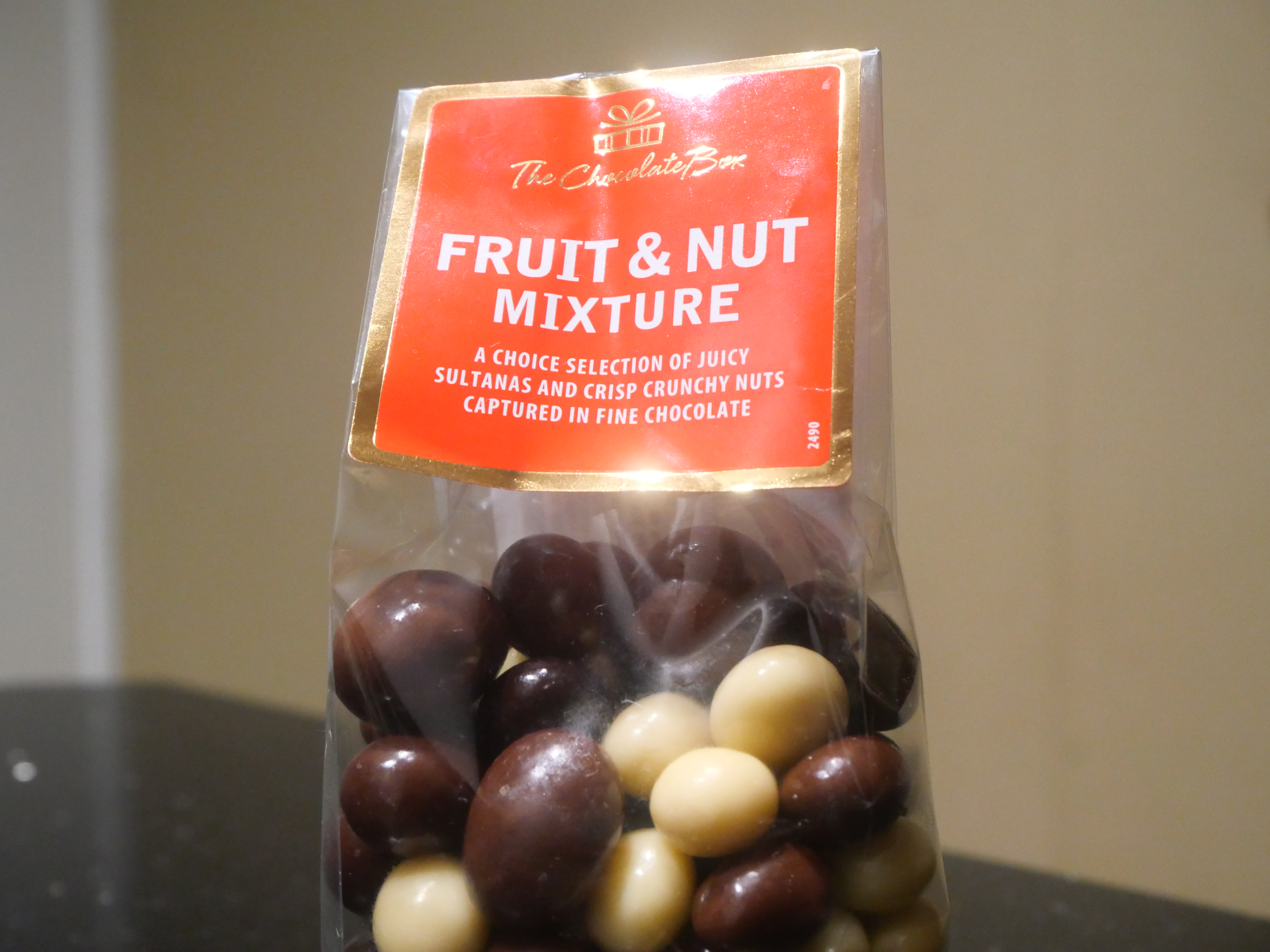
The Chocolate Box's fruit and nut mixture

== History ==
The Chocolate Box was founded by Richard Adler (1917-2011) and Rose Adler (née Guttman; 1924-2019) in 1958. Richard had been born in Uherské Hradiště, and trained as an officer in the Czechoslovak army until the country was occupied by Nazi Germany in 1939. As a Jew, Richard fled to Mandatory Palestine but was arrested in French Lebanon and forced into the French Foreign Legion. As he spoke both Czech and French, Richard served as a translator. After being evacuated to England from Dunkirk, he joined the British army as an engineer. During his time in Britain, he met Rose Guttman, who he married in 1943. Rose was born in Peiskretscham in Germany and was also Jewish. After the Nazis took power, her family left Germany for the United States on the MS St. Louis in 1939. The ship was refused entry to Cuba, the US, and Canada before returning to Europe where her family was accepted into the United Kingdom. During the Holocaust, Richard's parents were killed in Auschwitz.

In 1948, Richard and Rose emigrated to Australia with their daughter Marion. Settling in Melbourne, Richard and Rose bought the Smile Away Chocolates store in Camberwell in 1958, renaming it to The Chocolate Box. The Adlers drew from their European roots to make the business successful and began importing gourmet chocolates such as Baci, Lindt, and Ferrero. In 1963, they were both working full time at the store. The business first expanded in 1977 when they bought the nearby Waltons department store and expanded into other suburbs.

In the 1990s, Richard and Rose retired their role running the business, handing it over to their children Marion Adler-Bishop (born 1945) and Gary Adler (born 1955). Between 2002 and 2009, the business' bookkeeper Sandra Centorame redirected $1.09 million into personal accounts, which resulted in she being sentenced to three years in jail in 2010.

In December 2020, the company was bought by Paul Ryan.

== Stores ==
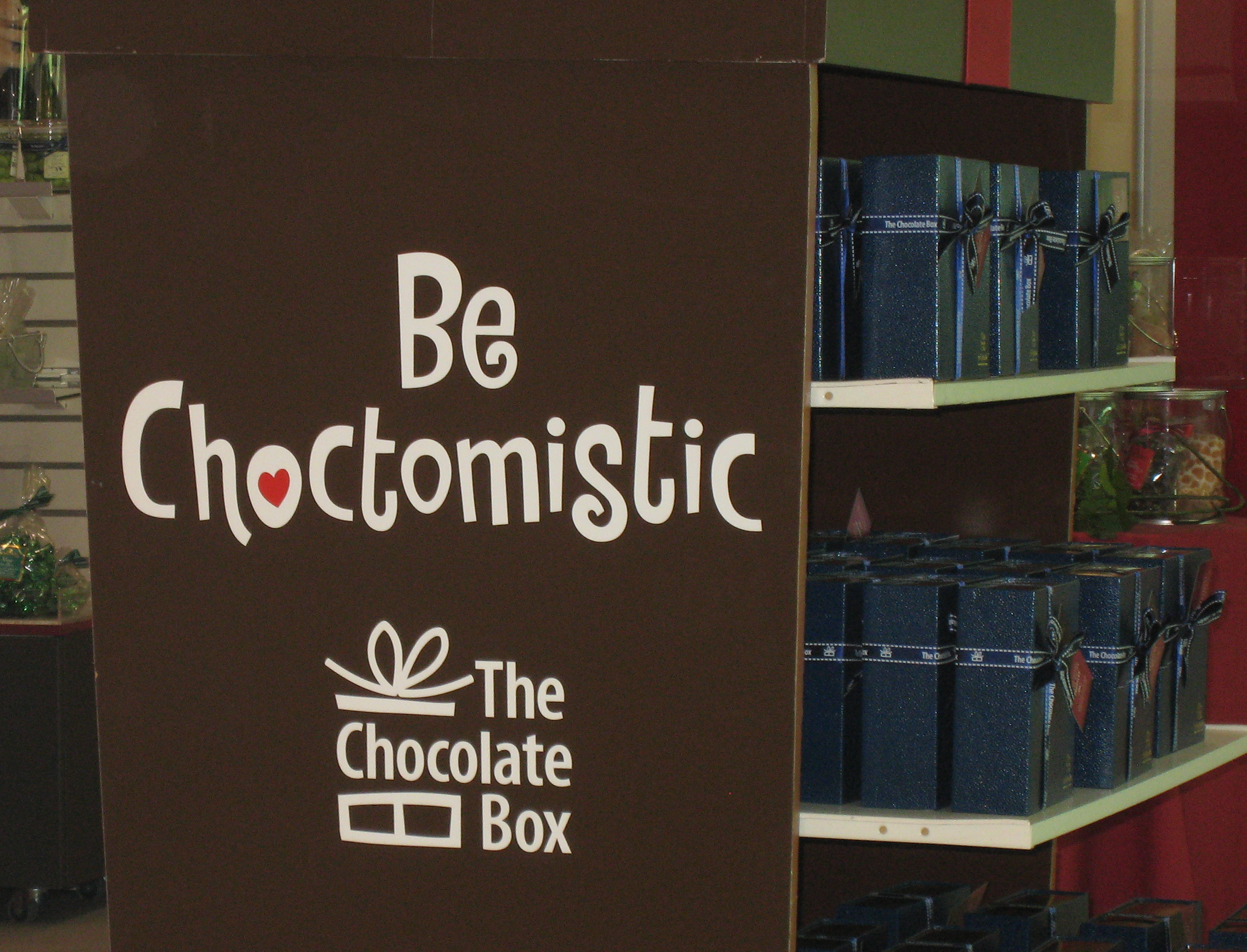
The Chocolate Box store in Melbourne Airport, 2006

The first store opened in 1958 is located along Burke road in Camberwell, Melbourne. When expanding their business, the Adlers looked for areas with high foot traffic except suburban shopping centres. The Chocolate Box's best performing stores in 2007 were in Southbank and Melbourne Airport. Marion Adler-Bishop said in 2007 that the business' future was in airports, casinos and online. In 2007, online business was growing at 75% a year. As of 2024, the company operates ten stores in Victoria and New South Wales, with store locations listed below:

Victoria
- Camberwell
- Port Melbourne
- Royal Melbourne Hospital
- Brighton
- Collins Place
- Melbourne Airport (Terminal 1)
- Melbourne Airport (Terminal 3)

New South Wales

- Potts Point
- Sydney Airport (Jetstar Pier B)
- Sydney Airport (Virign Pier B)
