= Chocolate box art =

Term describing idealistic paintings

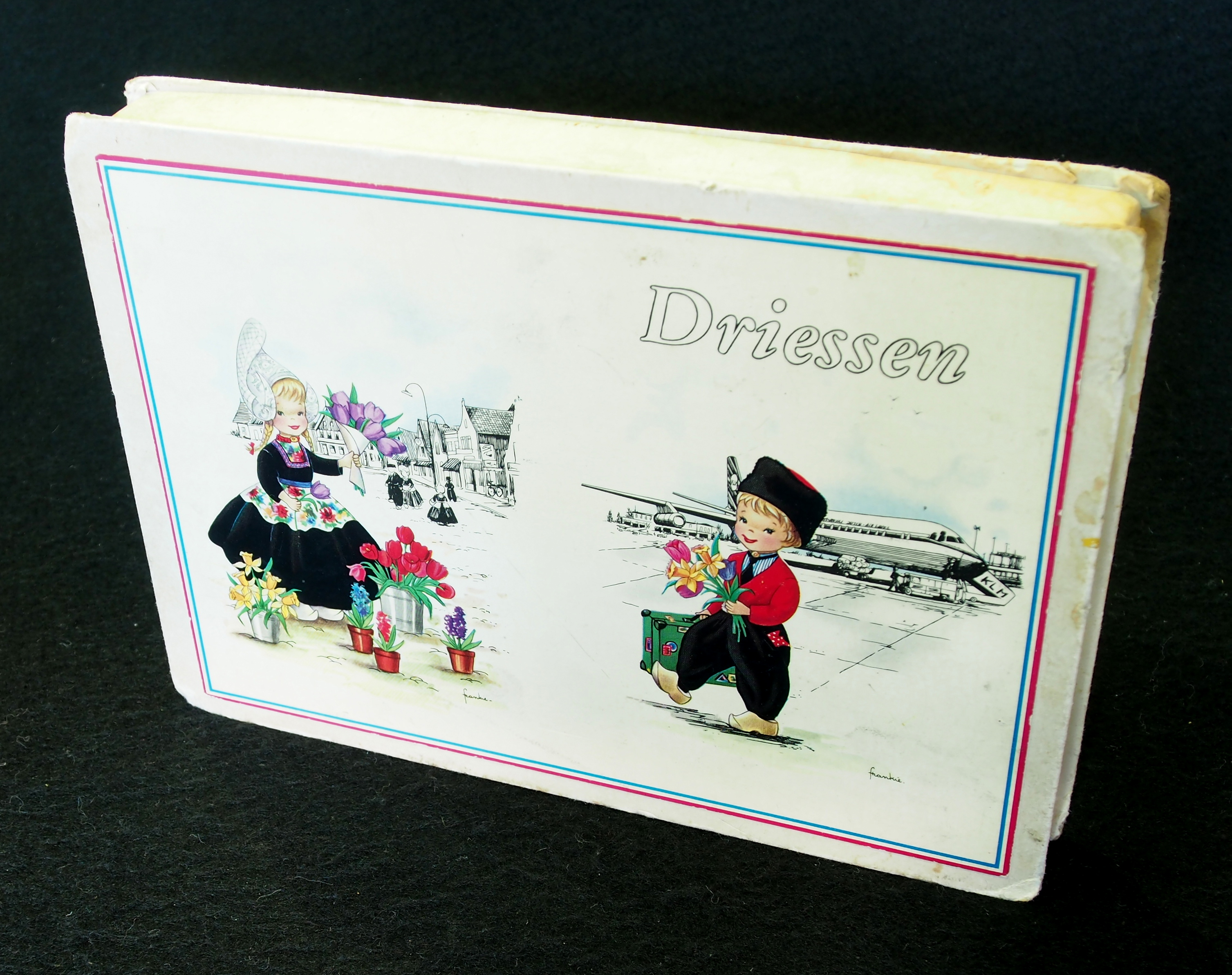
An example of a chocolate box with sentimental illustrations of children with flowers.

Chocolate box art is a category of artwork revolving around the decorations on chocolate boxes.

Using his own paintings of children, flowers and holiday scenes Richard Cadbury, the son of the founder of Cadbury's, introduced such designs to his chocolate boxes in the late 19th century.

Renoir's paintings have been described as "chocolate box" and have been derided by Degas and Picasso for being happy, inoffensive scenes. Constable's landscapes have also been so described.

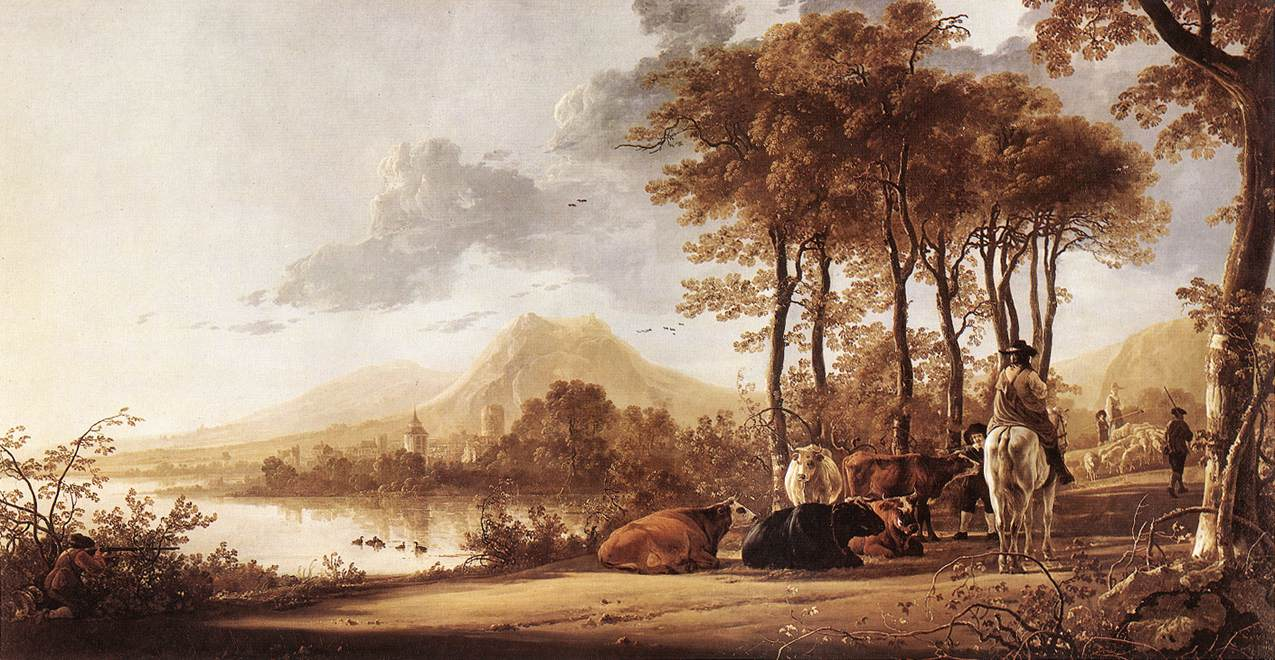
River Landscape (1660)

Aelbert Cuyp's River Landscape (1660), despite being widely regarded as his best work, has been criticised as having "chocolate box blandness". Fred Swan is a modern-day proponent of chocolate box paintings as, to his detractors, was Thomas Kinkade.

The term has also been applied to sculpture. A young couple standing locked in an embrace forms the centrepiece for the St Pancras International station in central London. Entitled The Meeting Place, the sculpture was made by the British sculptor Paul Day who admitted "Some will say it is a chocolate box sculpture". 'Chocolate box' is also used a descriptive term for architecture, particularly with cottages and rural villages, which are often compared to 'chocolate boxes' if their appearance is considered particularly quaint and sentimentally appealing.

== See also ==
- A. R. Quinton
- Nostalgia
