= Arthur Zorn =

- Born: 1954 (age 71–72)
- Origin: Montpelier, Vermont
- Instruments: Vocal, Piano
- Website: http://artzorn.com/

Arthur Zorn (born 1954) is a musician and artist from Montpelier, Vermont. Zorn is a composer of vocal and piano music. His major pieces, "January 25th, 1945" (about the liberation of Auschwitz) and "Garden Sketches" (a suite for piano) have been performed all around New England. Currently, Zorn resides in Barre Town, Vermont and formerly taught vocal music at Spaulding High School.

In July 2007, Zorn's newest artwork was to have been featured in the third installment of the Bundy Gallery's powerful series based on Zorn's creations; the third installment was to have been called "Zorn 3."

Arthur Zorn has won several awards for his teaching: he was elected Spaulding High School Teacher of the Year in 1994, and also won the Jaycee Outstanding Young Educator earlier in his career. Zorn has been a finalist in the Vermont State Teacher of the Year.
