= Barre Academy =

School in Vermont, United States

Barre Academy was a school in Barre, Vermont in operation from 1852 to 1885.

== History ==
The institution was incorporated by the Vermont Legislature in 1849. The school building was constructed in 1852, and the school "opened on September 1, 1852 for the fall term". It was "originally conceived as being supported by three religious denominations: Congregational, Methodist, and Universalist", with the original board of trustees being "carefully determined so as to be equally representative of these denominations". However, the bulk of the money was contributed by Congregationalists, and eventually they achieved control of the school, though it was nonsectarian in actual practice".

Jacob Shedd Spaulding (1811–1880) was the principal of the Barre Academy for most of its existence, serving in that capacity from the opening of the institution until his sudden death in 1880. Even before Spaulding's death, attendance at the school had declined somewhat, and under its next principal, A.N. Wheelock (himself a Barre Academy alumni), this decline continued until the closure of the school in 1885. After the Barre Academy closed, the original building was sold and moved from the site, and the Spaulding School Building, named in Spaulding's honor, was built on the site.

== Notable alumni ==
- John I. Gilbert, New York politician
- Simon W. Rosendale, first Jew elected to statewide office in New York
- Wendell Phillips Stafford, Justice of the Vermont Supreme Court, and U.S. District Judge for the District of Columbia
- Charles F. Templeton, Dakota Territorial Supreme Court Justice
