= Railroad Street Historic District =

Historic district in Vermont, United States

- U.S. National Register of Historic Places
- U.S. Historic district
- U.S. Historic district – Contributing property
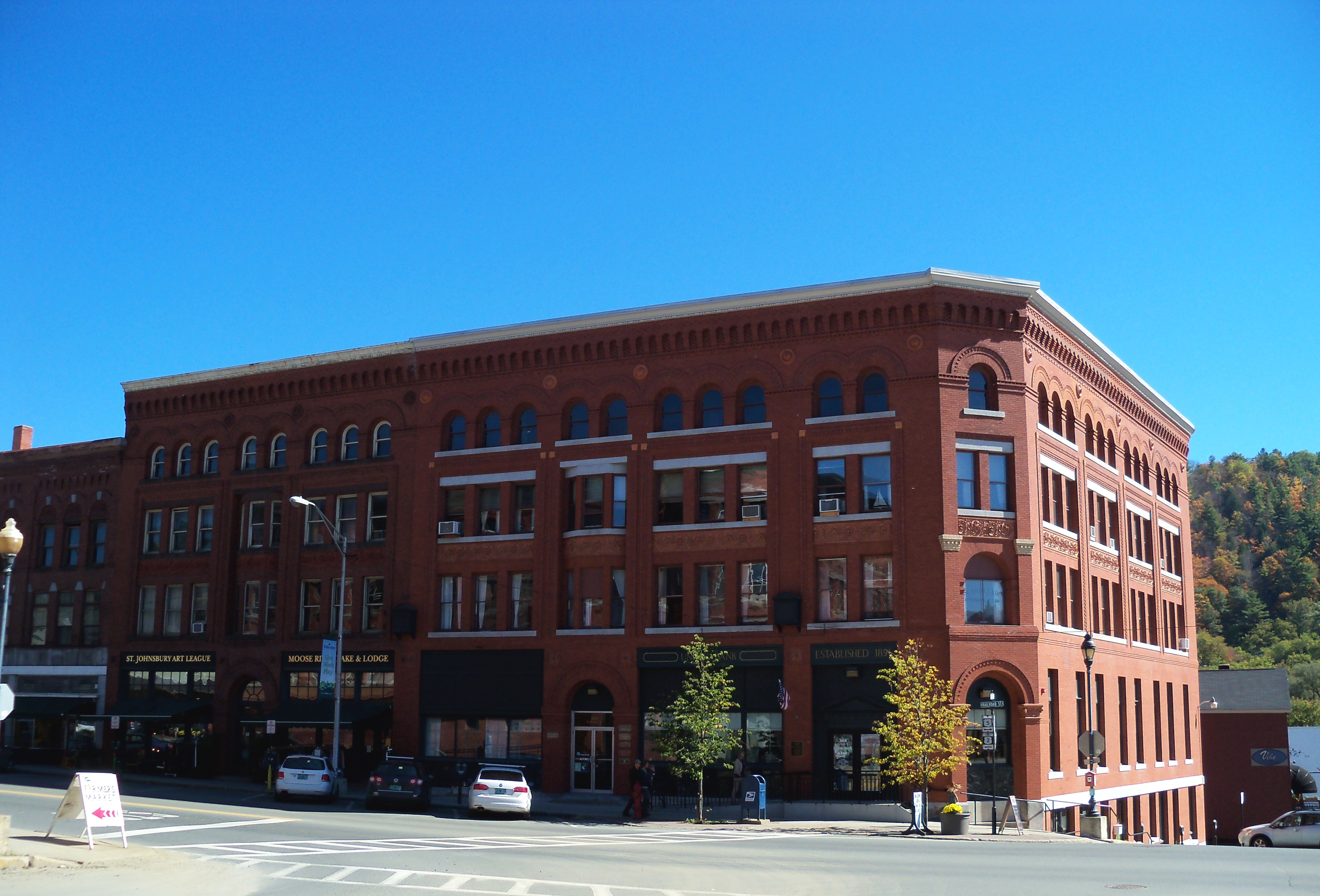
- The Citizens and Merchants Bank Blocks

- Location within Vermont Location within the United States
- Location: Roughly bounded N and S by Railroad St. and Canadian Pacific RR tracks, St. Johnsbury, Vermont
- Coordinates: 44°25′1″N 72°1′0″W
- Area: 5 acres (2.0 ha)
- Built: 1883
- Architect: Packard, Lambert; Multiple
- Architectural style: Romanesque, Vernacular Chateauesque
- Part of: St. Johnsbury Historic District (ID80000424)
- NRHP reference No.: 74000354

Significant dates
- Added to NRHP: June 25, 1974
- Designated CP: April 17, 1980

The Railroad Street Historic District encompasses a cluster of commercial and railroad-related buildings at the traditional late 19th-century heart of St. Johnsbury, Vermont. It includes five commercial buildings and the town's 1883 union depot, and is reflective of the town's importance as a major railroad junction in northern New England. The district was listed on the National Register of Historic Places in 1974. It was subsumed by the larger St. Johnsbury Historic District in 1980.

== Description and history ==
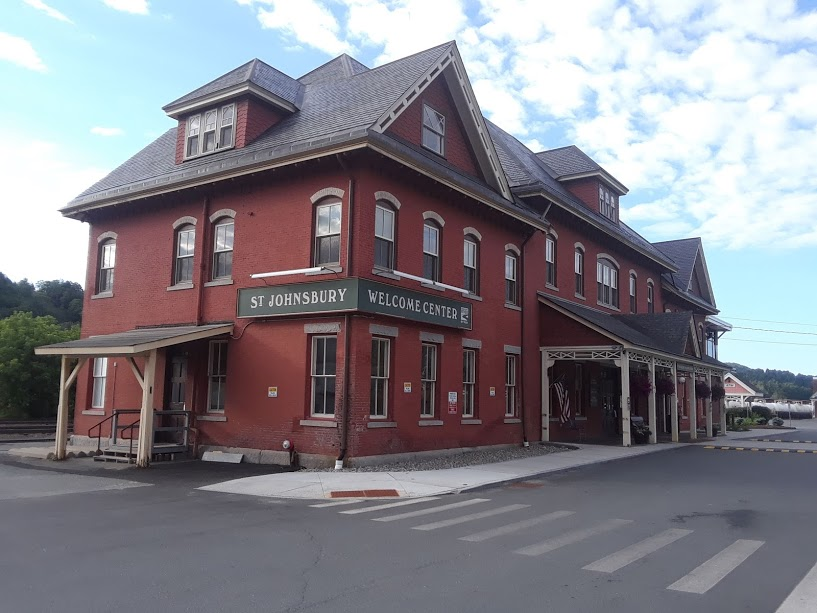
Former St. Johnsbury Union Station

The town of St. Johnsbury was transformed in the mid-19th century into a bustling railroad service center by the arrival of both north-south and east-west railroad lines. The town's Union Station, a substantial brick French Chateau-style building, was built to accommodate the traffic of both the Connecticut and Passumpsic Railroad (which carried main-line passenger traffic between Boston and Montreal) and the St. Johnsbury and Lake Champlain Railroad, which served north Vermont to the west. Fires in 1892 and 1896 cleared commercial buildings northwest of the depot, at what is now the corner of Railroad Street and Eastern Avenue. New brick commercial buildings were built to replace those lost in the fires.

The historic district includes, in addition to the 1883 depot, four buildings on the east side of Railroad Street, and one on the west side, all extending north from the junction with Eastern Avenue. It also includes Depot Square, a small grassy area between the depot and Railroad Street. The most architecturally prominent of the commercial buildings are the Citizens and Merchants Bank Blocks, a pair of similarly-styled Romanesque four-story blocks at the southern end of the row, which share an elaborate cornice and rows of arched windows. Both were designed by Lambert Packard, a prominent local architect who borrowed extensively from the Richardsonian Romanesque in the design of these buildings. On the west side of Railroad Street is the former New Avenue Hotel, also four stories in height, with a large round entry section at the corner of Railroad and Eastern.

== See also ==
- National Register of Historic Places listings in Caledonia County, Vermont
