= Vermont Historical Society =

U.S. state cultural heritage organization

Vermont History Center
- Established: 2002
- Location: 60 Washington Street; Barre, Vermont, United States
- Coordinates: 44.196°N 72.498°W
- Type: History
- Owner: Vermont Historical Society
- Website: vermonthistory.org/visit/vermont-history-museum

Seal of the Vermont Historical Society, with the motto non pro nobis laboramus.

Vermont History Museum
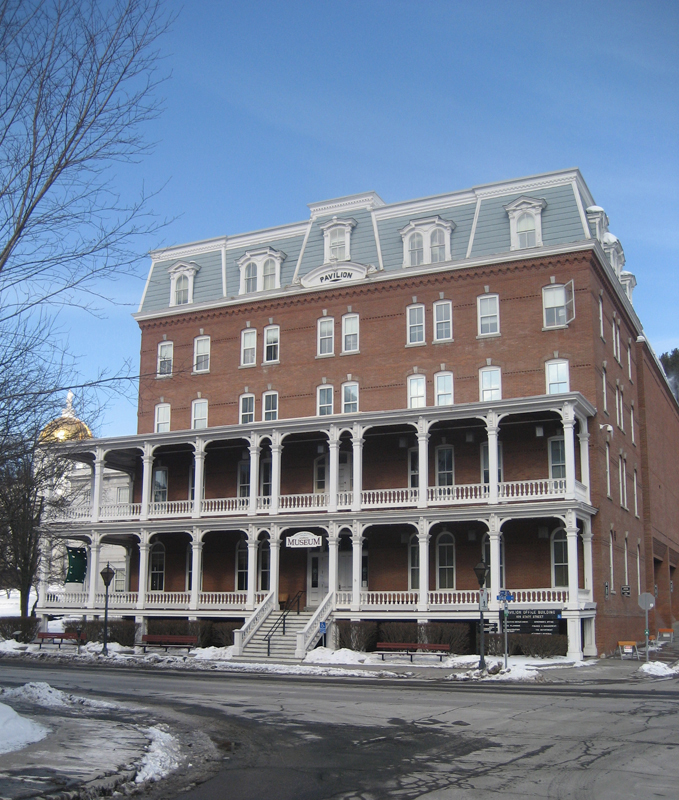
- Location: 109 State Street; The Pavilion; Montpelier, Vermont, United States
- Type: History
- Owner: Vermont Historical Society
- Website: vermonthistory.org/visit/vermont-history-museum

The Vermont Historical Society (VHS) was founded in 1838 to preserve and record the cultural history of the US state of Vermont. Headquartered in the old Spaulding School Building in Barre, the Vermont History Center is home to the Vermont Historical Society's administrative offices, the Leahy Library and a small book shop. In Montpelier the Society operates the Vermont History Museum in the Pavilion building, just east of the Vermont State House.

== Quick facts ==
- Vermont Historical Society was founded in 1838 to preserve and record Vermont’s history and culture.
- Vermont Historical Society is guided by 22 trustees and five officers, who are elected by the members at the annual meeting and conference.
- There are approximately 2,500 members.
- It has 11 full-time and 4 part-time employees

== Library ==
Named after Howard and Alba Leahy, the Leahy Library opened to the public in July 2002 and is a resource for individualized research. The library offers access to 50,000 catalogued books and serial titles, 1,500 linear feet of manuscripts, 30,000 photographs, 8,700 broadsides, more than 1,000 maps and an online public access catalogue. In addition, the library has the largest printed genealogical collection in the state.

== Vermont History Museum ==
Vermont Historical Society also operates the Vermont History Museum, which is located in Montpelier and housed in the Pavilion building next to the state capital. It has a collection of 20,000 artifacts including fine arts, crafts, household goods, clothing, agricultural tools, and industrial products from the pre-contact period to present.

This exhibit is also presented online.

== Vermont History Center ==
The Vermont History Center is the home of the Vermont Heritage Galleries, located in the beautiful historic Spaulding school building at 60 Washington Street in Barre, Vermont. The three exhibit galleries offer rotating exhibits on various aspects of Vermont history. The center also houses the Society's library and museum collections, administration offices, and a public meeting space.

== Programs ==
The Vermont Historical Society offers many programs, workshops and conferences on Vermont history.

=== Vermont History Expo ===
From 2000 to 2016 VHS presented the Vermont History Expo, a weekend-long celebration of the state's heritage in Tunbridge, Vermont. Each Expo featured a variety of themed attractions and events, including exhibits from 150+ local historical societies, museums, and heritage organizations; music; family activities; food; presentations; performances; and more.

=== Family and school programs ===
Vermont Historical Society's education department provides a wide range of programming for families, teachers, and students. Students and teachers can experience history with free field trips to the museum, history lending kits, and Vermont History Day, which allows students to delve thoroughly into a historical topic.

The Vermont Historical Society also offers an auxiliary website, Vermont History Explorer, geared to help children and teachers explore Vermont History. It includes maps, documents, approximately 150 photographs, and over 200 grade-appropriate articles about Vermont history.

=== Vermont Women’s History Project ===
The Vermont Women's History Project is a program that highlights the role women have played in shaping Vermont's history.

== League of Local Historical Societies & Museums ==
Since 1943, the Vermont Historical Society has provided outreach and support to Vermont's local history community through the League of Local Historical Societies and Museums. The League partners with all 192 of the state's small public libraries and 200 local museums and heritage organizations to provide free consultation on collections care and using technology to enhance rural access to historical information. This technical assistance includes collections care, e-newsletters, achievement awards program annual conference, and a publication listing all of Vermont's local historical societies.

== Publications ==
The Vermont Historical Society publishes History Connections: Vermont Historical Society News and Notes, a quarterly newsletter and the semi-annual journal Vermont History, the Proceedings of the Vermont Historical Society. The Vermont Historical Society also publishes books and exhibition catalogs on aspects of Vermont history, such as Freedom & Unity, The Problem of Slavery in Early Vermont, 1777–1810, by Harvey Amani Whitfield; The Vermont Difference, published with the Woodstock Foundation; and Moses Robinson and the Founding of Vermont, by Robert A. Mello, which focus on important aspects of Vermont history.

The Vermont Historical Society also offers two e-newsletters: the weekly Local History e-News, and the quarterly general history interest e-newsletter.

== See also ==
- List of historical societies in Vermont
