= Fairbanks Museum and Planetarium =

Natural science museum and planetarium in St. Johnsbury, Vermont

- Fairbanks Museum & Planetarium
- U.S. National Register of Historic Places
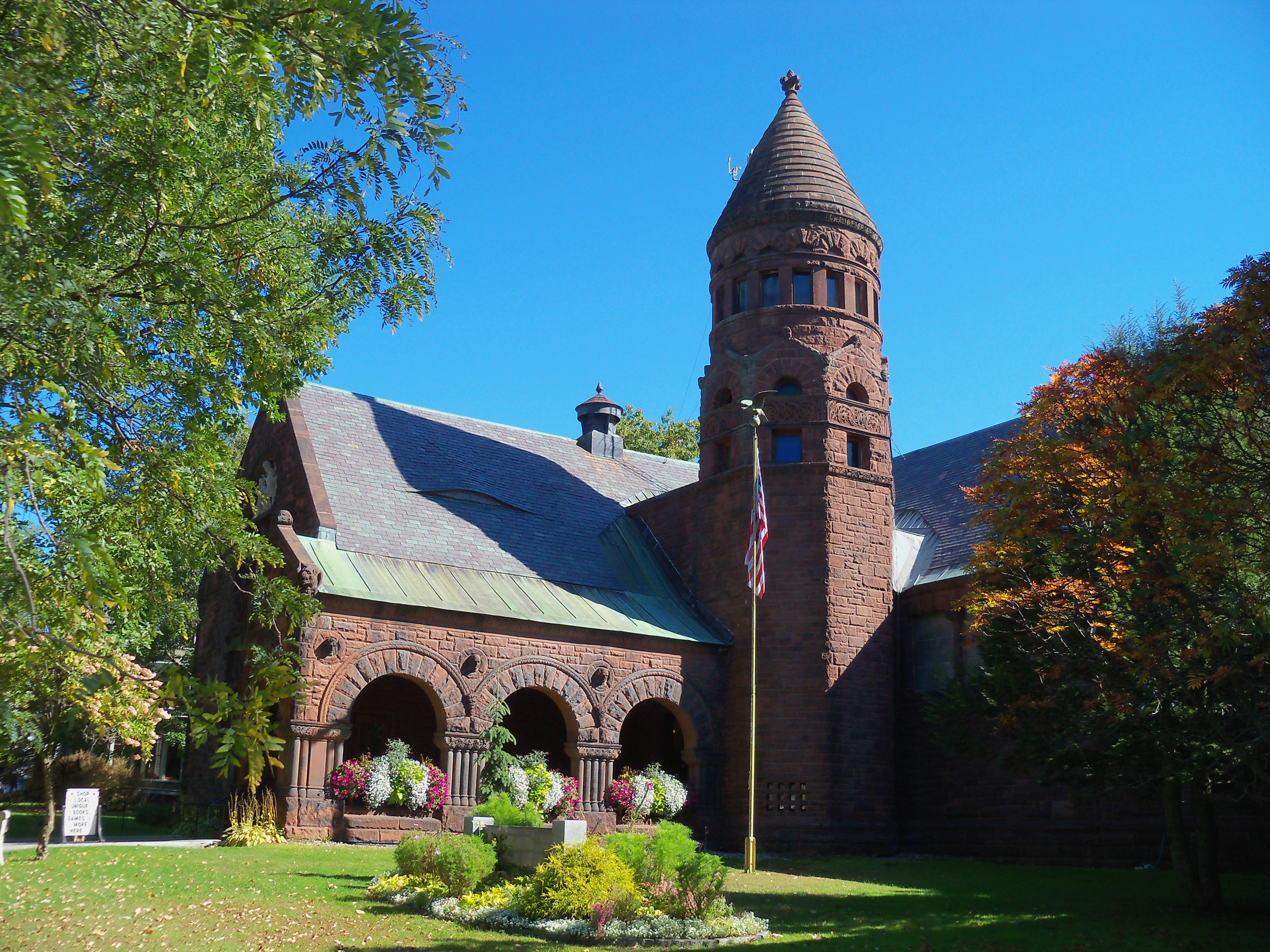
- Front of the main building

- Location within Vermont Location within the United States
- Location: 1302 Main St., St. Johnsbury, Vermont
- Coordinates: 44°25′12.6″N 72°1′11.4″W
- Area: 1 acre (0.40 ha)
- Built: 1890
- Architect: Packard, Lambert
- Architectural style: Romanesque
- Website: www.fairbanksmuseum.org
- NRHP reference No.: 07001344
- Added to NRHP: January 1, 2008
- Museum Director: Adam Kane (2014–)
- Planetarium Director, Senior Meteorologist: Mark Breen (1981–)

The Fairbanks Museum & Planetarium is a combination natural science museum, history museum, and planetarium located in St. Johnsbury, Vermont. It was founded in 1890 by businessman, politician, naturalist, and collector Franklin Fairbanks. The museum and its buildings are on the U.S. National Register of Historic Places.

The Eye on the Sky Weather Center is a meteorology and weather forecasting station operated regularly at the site since 1893. Meteorologists broadcast their unique weather forecasts for Vermont, New Hampshire, and areas immediately around the region, on Vermont Public Radio and Magic 97.7. The facility also produces daily weather forecasts for three newspapers: The Caledonian Record, Times Argus, and Rutland Herald.

The Lyman Spitzer Jr. Planetarium, established in 1960, is located at the museum, and produces public astronomy shows, as well as educational classes on various space science topics. Other productions of the planetarium include the Eye on the Night Sky astronomy program for radio broadcast, and the Night Owl astronomy & spaceflight news articles for online and print publication.

== History ==
Fairbanks M&P logo used until 2010 features Saturn behind one of the museum's polar bears

The town of St. Johnsbury had a long history with the Fairbanks family, having been the location of the Fairbanks Scales headquarters and factories since the 1820s, as well as several other mansions and estates owned by members of the family. Before founding the museum, Franklin Fairbanks had served as president of the company, which his father and uncle had founded.

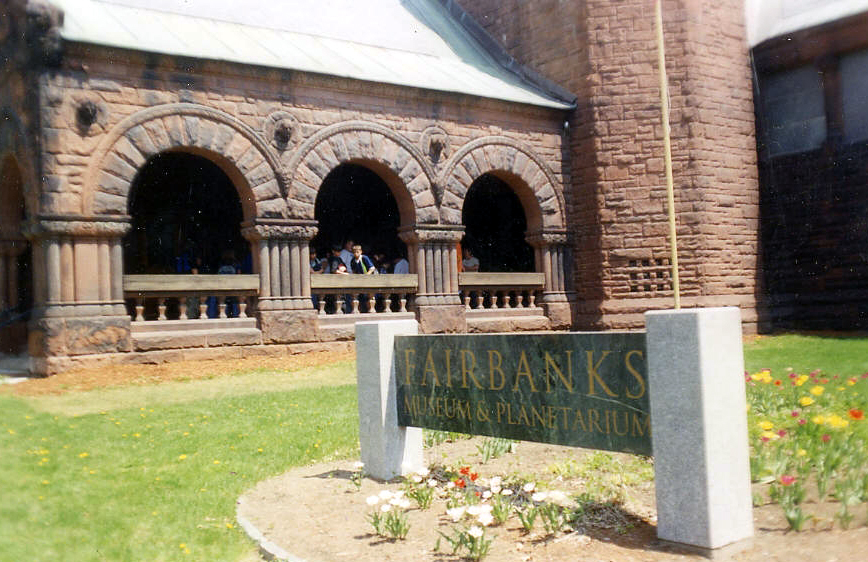
Sign on front lawn beside the entrance of the museum

The location for the museum, a plot of land Fairbanks already owned in the St. Johnsbury village, had been inspected, approved, cleared, and prepared in 1889. Construction on the main building began with a ceremony on 4 July 1890 when Frances Clapp Fairbanks laid the cornerstone. The building was finished by spring 1891, opening to the public later that year. Designed by Lambert Packard, the building features red sandstone and limestone laid in Richardsonian-Romanesque style. The museum was expanded in 1894 to house the entire growing collection, moving from its previous location, Fairbanks' own house, Undercliffe Mansion, where the items and artifacts had been kept beginning in the 1870s. Much of the main collection in the museum comes from Fairbanks' own pre-existing collection, for which the museum was purposefully built to contain and display.

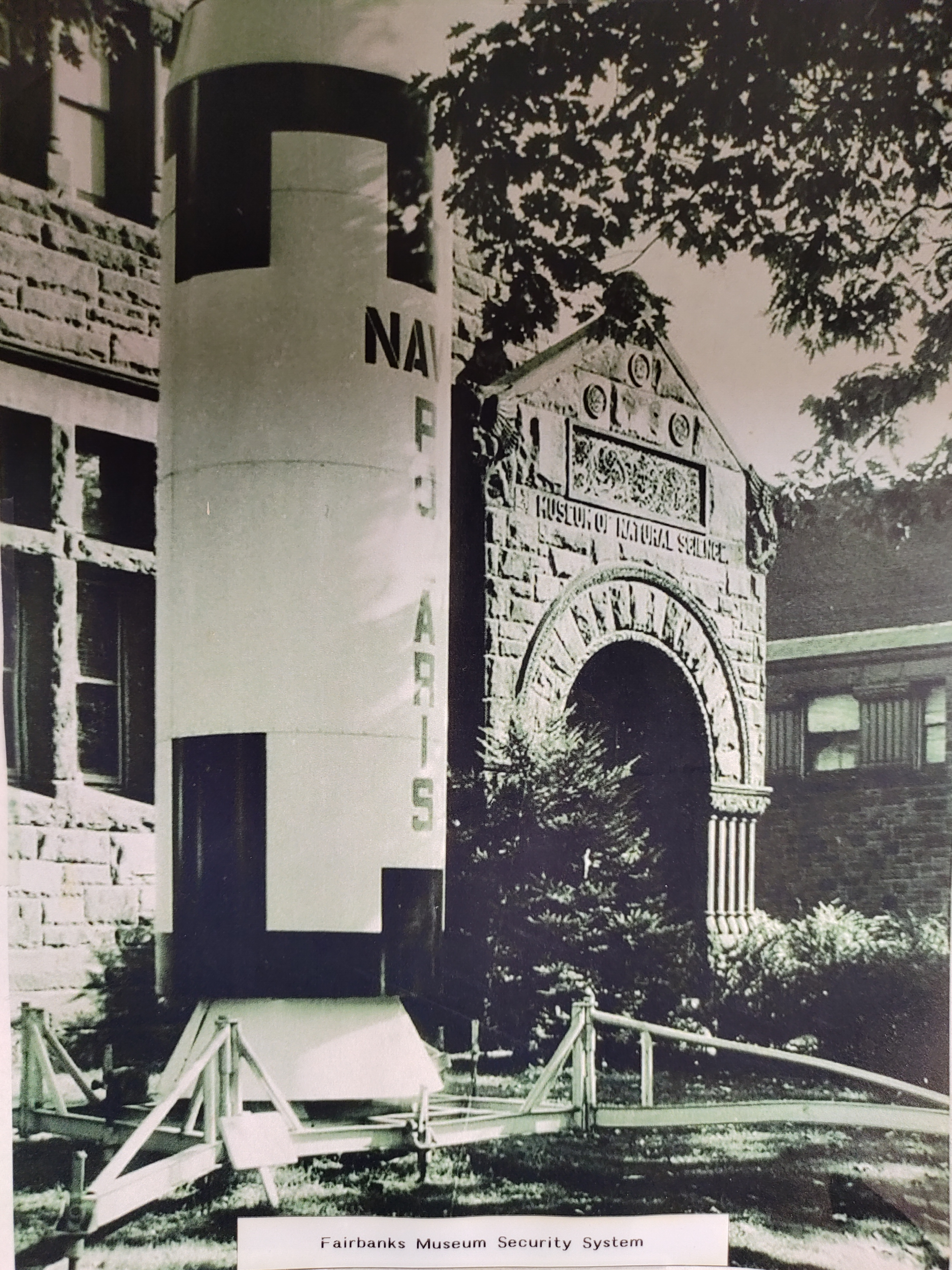
A U.S. Navy Polaris missile rocket displayed in front of the museum in the early 1960s, dubbed the "Fairbanks Museum Security System".

Between 1959 and 1960, the planetarium and space gallery were installed, replacing the Colonial Room exhibit gallery. It opened to the public in April 1961, becoming the only public planetarium in Vermont, and has been periodically upgraded over time, while being continuously operated ever since.

In 2017, the Shippee Family Eye Care Butterfly House was installed in the courtyard behind the Museum's main gallery. An open structure with a canopy cover and benches along the inside, the butterfly house is an immersive experience that invites guests to walk among native butterflies and local flora during the summer months.

The Fairbanks Museum has seen continuous operation since its founding, other than annual brief closures every January for upkeep and maintenance of the exhibits and facilities, and rotation of the vast collection in and out of storage. Normal operations had the museum open 10 AM 5 PM. ET every day of the week. However, due to the COVID-19 pandemic, the museum closed in March 2020, and only partially reopened between July–December 2020, The museum reopened again in early March 2021, with the planetarium reopening, under restrictions, in late May 2021. While closed, the weather station and some educational programs continued to operate, holding regular online classes and science livestreams, as well as pandemic situation updates for local residents in Vermont and New Hampshire.

Between 2020 and 2023, major modification and construction is taking place to expand the eastern side of main building in a project known as the "Tang Science Annex", to provide more exhibition area and greater accessibility, with major funding being provided by the U.S. Department of Commerce Economic Development Administration. General building maintenance and preservation work is also being carried out during this time.

== Contemporary museum collection ==
The museum is organized into 6 different departments or categories, which are reflected in its logo and hexagon theme found throughout the museum: Natural History, Geoscience, Ethnology, Engineering, Meteorology, and Astronomy. The entire collection includes roughly 175,000 objects. Storage and archive spaces are maintained on site for many of the items when not on display.

The museum's exhibits include natural specimens, a seasonal wildflower table, a native butterfly house and flower garden, an observation beehive, artistic pieces made out of insects, taxidermy dioramas (moose, bison, flamingos, bears, birds of paradise, snakes, woodchucks and opossums), endangered and extinct species, dinosaurs and fossils, as well as geological displays, ethnographic displays, and various historical and cultural artifacts from around the world. On the second floor there is an exhibit about atmospheric ice crystal formation, featuring photographs by Snowflake Bentley, a friend of Franklin Fairbanks. Also displayed are 19th and 20th century manufacturing hardware and scales from the E & T Fairbanks Scales Company, founded by Franklin's father and uncle, Erastus and Thaddeus Fairbanks. Educational classes are regularly provided for local schools and tour groups. An audio tour of the exhibits is available to visitors as well.

== Weather Center ==
Meteorological records by the Fairbanks family in St. Johnsbury date back to the 1870s at the Undercliffe mansion, and were then moved to the Fairbanks Museum in 1891, with regular weather recordings at the same unaltered location beginning in late 1893. In part, the museum's tradition of reporting the weather and atmospheric conditions comes from Franklin Fairbanks' own practice of doing so. The meteorological instruments are located primarily behind the main building, where they also serve as a weather recording exhibit, as well as on a truss affixed on top of the museum roof.

The Northern New England Weather Center, also known as the Eye on the Sky Weather Center, was established at the museum in November 1981 by meteorologists Steve Maleski and Mark Breen, continuing the written weather reports for the NWS, but expanding to include local radio and print media weather forecasting, with the creation of broadcasting studios for meteorologists. Initially located in the basement of the main building (which often drew questions and criticism about the lack of windows and visibility for the forecasters to see the actual sky), the weather center's studios were relocated in 2017 to another building at the back of the museum campus.

The weather center produces the Eye on the Sky daily forecast, Eye on the Night Sky weekly night sky forecast for astronomy, as well as the Skywatch Almanac meteorology and astronomy newsletter and online blog.

== Planetarium ==
The Lyman Spitzer Jr. Planetarium and Vinton Space Science Gallery (sometimes shortened to simply the "Spitzer Planetarium"), located at the top of a spiral staircase on the second floor overhanging the front entrance, was built between 1959 and 1960 following the International Geophysical Year, and first publicly opened in April 1961, under museum director Fred Mold. It is named after famed scientist Lyman Spitzer Jr., a pioneer of modern astrophysics and astronomical observation. In the planetarium lobby is the space science gallery, displayed in which are astrophotographs from the Northern Skies Observatory in nearby Peacham, Vermont, images from the Spitzer Space Telescope, as well as an iron-nickel meteorite recovered in Patagonia. Also in the gallery is a Fairbanks Scale which displays the equivalent weight of an object or person if it were in the gravitational field of the Moon or other planets in the Solar System.

Live shows and presentations as well as planetarium movies cover a variety of topics, including basic backyard stargazing, the history and development of astronomy, constellations and their association with various mythology and cultures, celestial navigation, artificial satellites and spacecraft missions, Lunar exploration, planetary science, heliophysics, exoplanetary science, astrodynamics, and cosmology. It is one of only two public planetaria in northern New England, along with the McAuliffe-Shepard Discovery Center.

=== History and upgrades ===
The section of the museum now occupied by the planetarium previously contained a historical exhibit about Vermont during the colonial period. During the earlier years of its operation, the planetarium originally used simple folding chairs situated around a projection module, but in the early 1980s the chairs were replaced by rows of curved benches arranged in semicircles on either side.

In 2012, the planetarium was upgraded with the installation of digital hardware and software, greatly increasing capabilities, and allowing for the projection of specialized 360° video. However, the analog hardware originally used in the 1960s, including a control panel and a dodecahedron with optical pinholes used for star projection, are on permanent display on the main floor of the museum.

The planetarium was further renovated between 2018 and 2019, including the replacement of the benches with modern seating in a more traditional theater arrangement, and rotating the hemispherical projection screen forward, both expanding audience capacity and improving comfortability of the domed theater. An elevator was also installed to improve accessibility, connecting the main museum entrance with the planetarium lobby.

=== Events and outreach ===
The Fairbanks Museum & Planetarium set the Guinness World Record for the "largest astronomy lesson" in 2018 when 1,580 people attended a 40 minute program held across the street from the Museum. The planetarium regularly coordinates with the Vermont Astronomical Society and the Northern Skies Observatory, an astronomy research, observation, and image and data processing center located in Peacham, Vermont, to host public outdoor astronomy events at the observatory site and across the state. In more recent years, Spitzer Planetarium presenters also utilize a smaller, inflatable dome, called a "portable planetarium", featuring the same projection software as the main planetarium, for presentations at schools, libraries, and other indoor event spaces in the region. Annual spring astronomy camp includes astronomy lessons about planets, stars, constellations, and space probe missions, as well as basic chemistry and physics lessons, which includes the construction and launching of model rockets.

Notable space themed events hosted by the museum include a series of special planetarium shows and astronomy outreach events for the 2009 International Year of Astronomy, observations of the 2012 Transit of Venus, the 2017 North American Solar Eclipse, and a 2018 world record astronomy observation. From 16 to 24 July 2019, the museum displayed exhibits celebrating the semicentennial of Apollo 11; on 20 July, it hosted an event which featured a real-time rebroadcast of the mission, showings of contemporary documentaries from 1969, model rocket construction and launching, spaceflight simulations, planetarium shows focused on the Moon and both past and future human lunar exploration, as well as lunar regolith and rock samples from various Apollo missions obtained by the museum for temporary display by NASA as part of a public science outreach initiative by the agency in observation of the event.

During closure due to the COVID-19 pandemic, the planetarium hosted live online events, answering questions submitted by local residents and students about the topics, including the 2020 Winter Solstice Jupiter-Saturn Conjunction, featuring telescope views and descriptions of the two planets and their moons, live coverage of the Mars 2020 Perseverance rove landing, hosted by Fairbanks science communicators, featuring live telemetry from NASA JPL during the craft's descent, and a commemoration of Yuri's Night 2021, the 60th anniversary of Vostok 1, 40th anniversary of STS-1, the first flight of the Mars 2020 Ingenuity helicopter, as well as International Space Station port relocations and crew rotations of Soyuz MS-17/18 and Dragon Crew-1/2 happening around the same occasion. In July 2021, the museum hosted an event both on-site and online with Dr. Jennifer Gruber, a program manager and engineer working on NASA's Artemis Program at the Moon, providing updates about the program including SLS, HLS, and CLPS developments, and taking questions from the audience.

For the 2024 North American Solar Eclipse, the museum expected a greater event than that of 2017, as the path of totality will be passing over the area of Vermont, providing a more spectacular viewing opportunity.

== Praise and recognition ==
The museum was listed on the National Register of Historic Places in 2008. The listing included one contributing building and two contributing objects.

On 10 August 2018, the museum obtained the world record for the largest astronomy observation event, with over 1500 people attending a live night sky astronomy lesson, as well as telescope demonstrations and other educational displays. The event was certified by Guinness World Records and covered by Vermont Public Radio and local news media.

In 2019, the museum's weather station surpassed its 125th anniversary, and was recognized by the World Meteorological Organization, National Weather Service, and NOAA as the second oldest regular meteorological observation station in North America, after the Blue Hill Meteorological Observatory, having begun a continuous streak of weather observations in early 1894.

== See also ==
- National Register of Historic Places listings in Caledonia County, Vermont
- List of science museums in the United States
- List of planetariums in the United States
- List of meteorology institutions
