= Van Tassell and Kearney Horse Auction Mart =

Commercial building in Manhattan, New York

- U.S. National Register of Historic Places
- New York State Register of Historic Places
- New York City Landmark
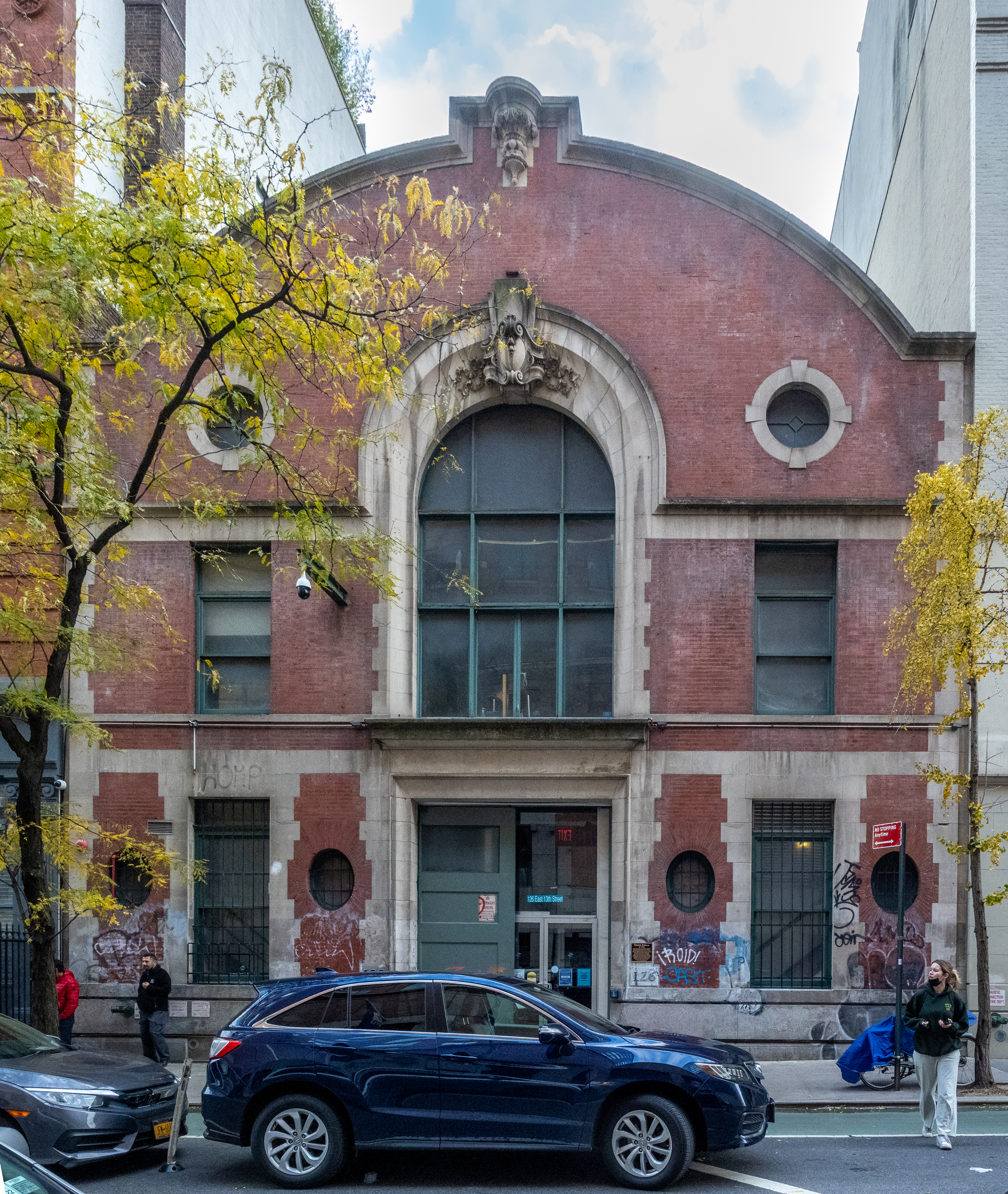
- Location: 126-128 East 13th Street, New York, New York
- Coordinates: 40°43′58″N 73°59′21″W
- Area: less than one acre
- Built: 1903
- Architect: Jardine, Kent & Jardine
- Architectural style: Beaux Arts
- NRHP reference No.: 07001233
- NYSRHP No.: 06101.015842
- NYCL No.: 2205

Significant dates
- Added to NRHP: November 29, 2007
- Designated NYSRHP: April 23, 2007
- Designated NYCL: May 15, 2012

The Van Tassell and Kearney Horse Auction Mart is a building in East Village, Manhattan, New York City. The building was constructed in 1903-04 to the designs of Jardine, Kent & Jardine in the Beaux-Arts Style. It originally served as a horse auction mart that catered to New York's elite families, including the Vanderbilts and Delanos. Each Tuesday and Friday, Van Tassell & Kearney held auctions in the building. Though carriages remained an important part of the business, most advertisements and newspaper stories about the mart concerned the sale of horses, particularly high-priced ribbon winners, polo ponies, hunters, and thoroughbreds. Other sales were devoted to breeding stock and coach horses, including a large group of horses co-owned by Alfred W. Vanderbilt and Robert L. Gerry in 1906.

As automobiles and other forms of public transit became much more common after World War I, the practical need for horses and stables decreased. The auction mart ceased functioning in the 13th Street building. It served as an assembly-line training center for women during World War II. From 1978 to 2005, artist Frank Stella owned the building and used it as his studio. His nearly 30-year stewardship of the building resulted in the facade being cleaned and restored.

In 2006, after discovering plans of a new owner to demolish the building and replace it with a condo development, the Greenwich Village Society for Historic Preservation (GVSHP) asked the New York City Landmarks Preservation Commission (LPC) to hold an emergency hearing on the structure. There was significant support for designation, including City Councilmember Rosie Mendez. Playing on the history of the building as an assembly line training center for women during World War II, GVSHP used the iconic "We Can Do It!" image (often associated with Rosie the Riveter) on stickers, flyers, and T-shirts emblazoned with the slogan "We Can Save It! Landmark 128 East 13th Street" as part of the campaign to secure landmark designation for the building. The LPC held a public hearing and halted demolition plans, but did not immediately designate the building. On November 29, 2007, the building was listed on the State and National Register of Historic Places. GVSHP and other advocates continued to push for designation. In May 2012, after a 6-year campaign, the LPC voted unanimously to designate the former Van Tassell & Kearney Horse Auction Mart a New York City designated landmark.

In January 2010 after an extensive renovation, Peridance Center opened here at its new location. That facility included a performance venue, the KnJ Theater.

== See also ==
- National Register of Historic Places listings in Manhattan below 14th Street
