= Davis Collamore & Co. =

- Company type: Private
- Industry: Porcelain, glassware, luxury imports
- Founded: 1842
- Founder: Davis Collamore
- Headquarters: New York City, United States
- Number of locations: Fifth Avenue, New York City; Newport, Rhode Island
- Key people: Davis Collamore (1820–1887); Gilman Collamore (1834–1888)
- Products: Imported porcelain, cut glass, fine china

Davis Collamore & Co. was a high-end New York City importer of porcelain and glass, headed by Davis Collamore (7 October 1820 — 13 August 1887). The firm, rivals to Tiffany & Co. and Black, Starr & Frost, commissioned designs from Copeland Spode and Thomas Minton Sons, that featured hand-painted details over transfer-printed outlines and often rich gilding. Porcelain by Haviland, Royal Worcester, and Villeroy & Boch also appear with the firm's stamped underglaze marks integrated with the manufacturer's. Davis Collamore was among the first to recognize the beauty and value of American-made cut glass and also offered Rookwood Pottery, for which they were the representatives at the Exposition Universelle, Paris 1889.

Davis Collamore, born in Scituate, Massachusetts to a family that had been settled there since 1639, was the youngest of twelve children. At the age of sixteen he moved to New York City to be employed by his brother Ebenezer, an importer of glass and china, at 171 Broadway, with a residence near St. John's Park. In 1842 he established his own business, at 595 Broadway.

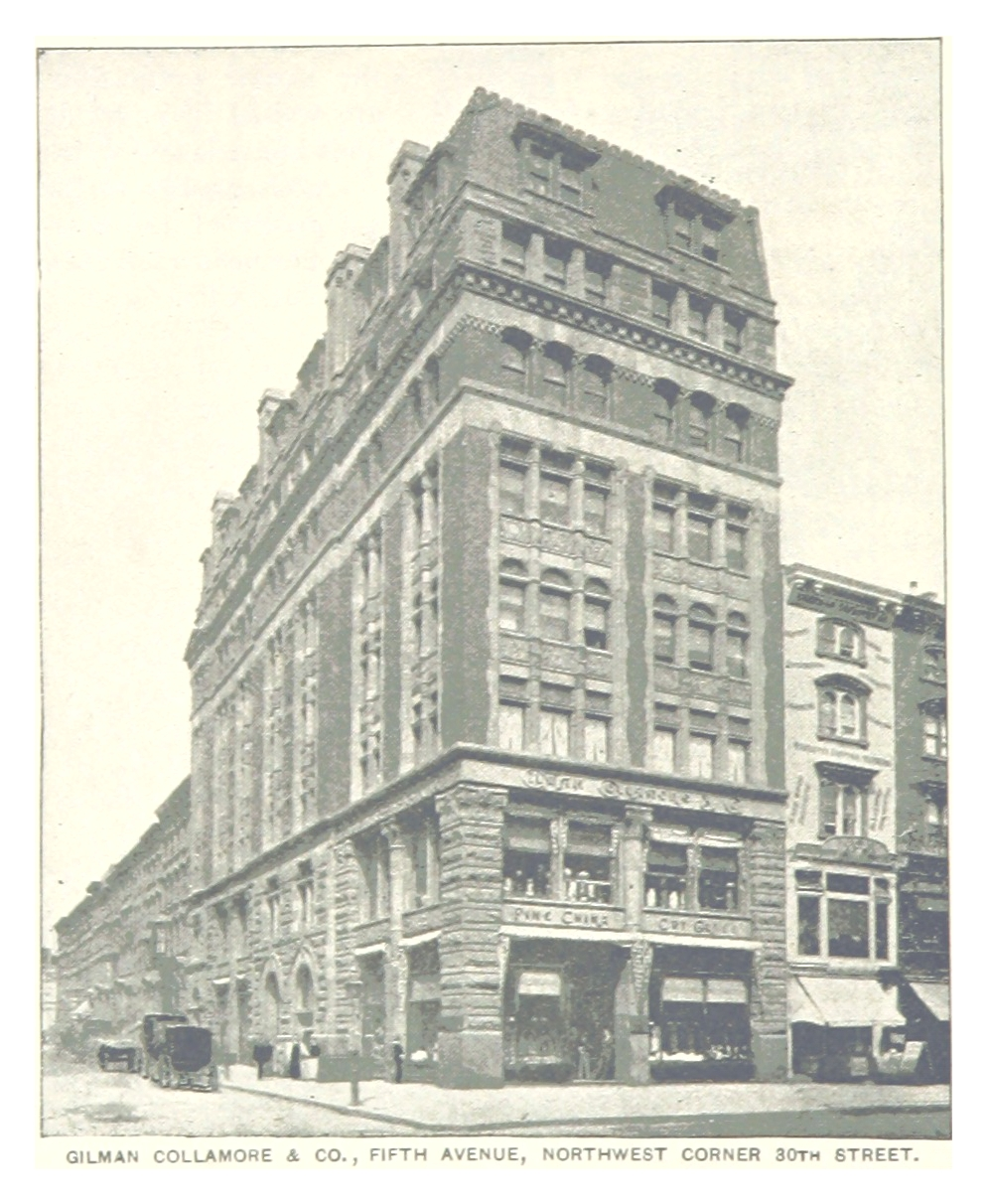
GILMAN COLLAMORE, 5th Ave & 30th St

His brother Gilman Collamore (1834—1888) came to join him in 1854. Gilman established his own business in 1861. Gilman Collamore & Co., in premises at 731 Broadway in 1861, then occupied premises in Union Square before taking two storeys of showrooms in The Wilbraham, a fashionable block of bachelor flats at Fifth Avenue and 30th Street, that opened in 1890; about 1920 new premises were constructed for the firm at 15 East 56th Street

Davis Collamore & Co.'s premises also matched the moves uptown of fashionable New Yorkers. An ad for tea and dinner services advertised from the firm's early premises, at 479 Broadway, just below Broome Street, appeared in Harper's Weekly, 25 April 1863. Retail shops were opened at Broadway and 21st Street, then on the southwest corner of Fifth Avenue and 37th Street, and then, in 1911, at 48th and Fifth Avenue and finally at 7 and 9 East 52nd Street. There was a branch at the fashionable resort of Newport, Rhode Island.

On November 7, 1842, he married Hannah Augusta Fiske of Boston; they had four children, two of whom died in infancy. Mrs Collamore died on November 13, 1882. As a member of the New York 7th Regiment he was present at the Astor Place Riot of May 1849. In 1864 he purchased seventy acres at Orange, New Jersey and retired to the country house, "Belhurst", he built there on the mountain's slope, to a design by his nephew George Hathorne.
