= The Wilbraham =

Historic building in Manhattan, New York

- U.S. National Register of Historic Places
- New York State Register of Historic Places
- New York City Landmark
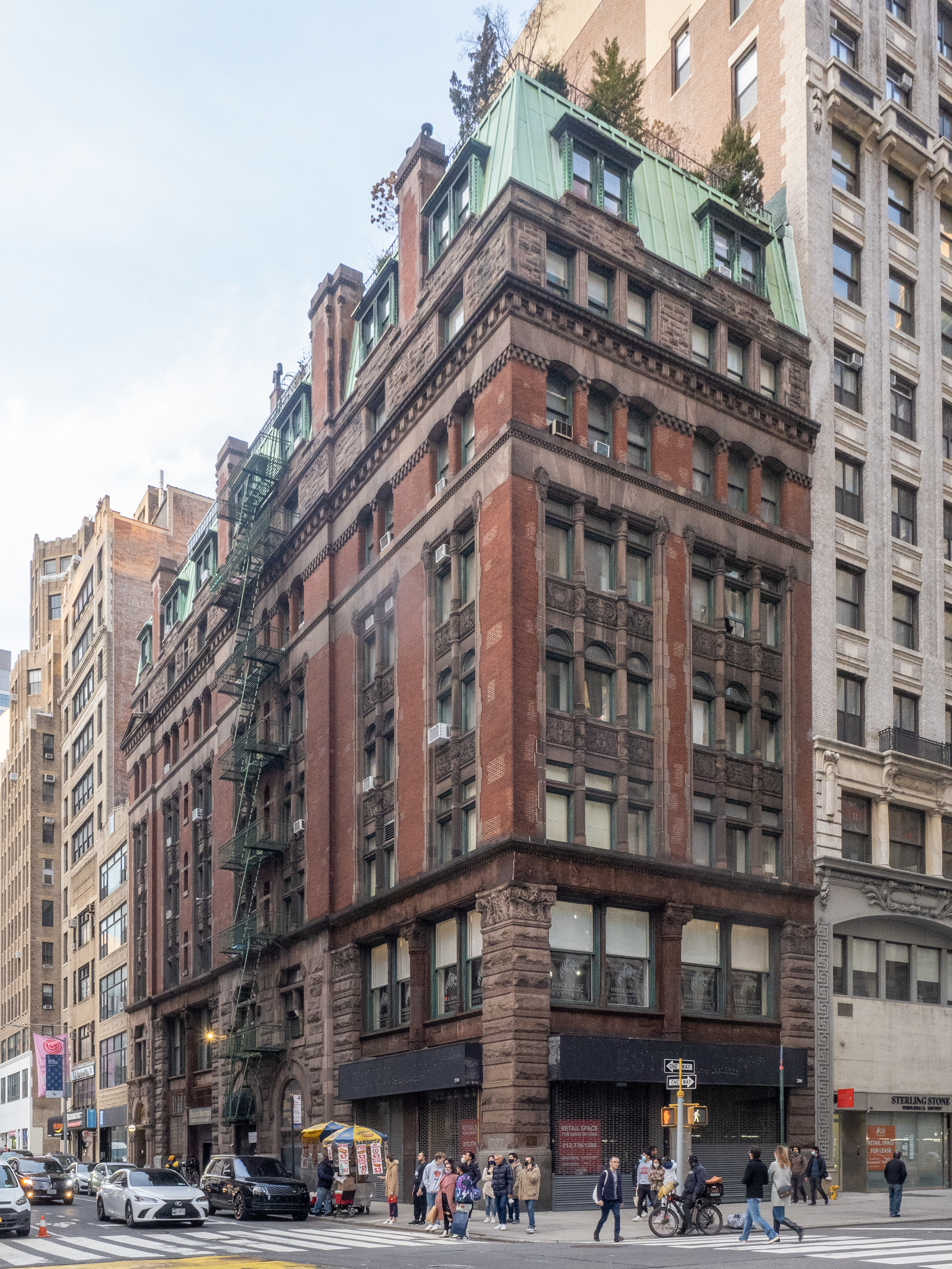
- South and west elevations of the facade from across Fifth Avenue, 2022
- Location: Manhattan, New York
- Coordinates: 40.7462°N 73.9867°W
- Built: 1888–1890
- Architect: David and John Jardine
- Architectural style: Romanesque revival
- Restored: 1934–1935
- Restored by: D. Everett Waid and Emery Roth
- NRHP reference No.: 100002386
- NYSRHP No.: 06101.017231
- NYCL No.: 2153

Significant dates
- Added to NRHP: May 4, 2018
- Designated NYSRHP: March 19, 2018
- Designated NYCL: June 8, 2004

The Wilbraham is an apartment building at 282–284 Fifth Avenue and 1 West 30th Street in the Midtown South neighborhood of Manhattan in New York City. The nine-story structure was designed by David and John Jardine in the Romanesque Revival style, with elements of the Renaissance Revival style, and occupies the northwestern corner of 30th Street and Fifth Avenue. It was built between 1888 and 1890 as a bachelor apartment hotel. The New York City Landmarks Preservation Commission has designated the Wilbraham as an official city landmark, and the building is listed on the National Register of Historic Places.

The building occupies a rectangular site and has a facade that is divided horizontally into three sections. The lowest two stories are clad in rusticated blocks of New Jersey brownstone, with storefronts near the western and eastern ends of the facade. The third through sixth stories are clad in Philadelphia red brick, the seventh story is clad in ashlar, and the eighth story is located within a mansard roof. The Wilbraham retains much of its original layout, which is composed of storefronts and a lobby on the lowest two floors, as well as apartments on the third through eighth floors. The building originally had 42 apartments and five servants' quarters, which by the 2010s had been consolidated into 38 apartments. Its bachelor flats each consisted of a bedroom and parlor, with a bathroom but no kitchen; the communal dining room was on the eighth floor.

The building was a speculative development by Scottish-American jeweler William Moir, at a time when clubs, hotels, and the first blocks of "French flats" were being developed in the area. When the Wilbraham opened in May 1890, china and glass importer Davis Collamore & Co. leased two floors of showrooms. John J. Gibbons, the leader of Davis Collamore & Co., bought the building in 1908 and sold it in 1927. The Metropolitan Life Insurance Company took over the Wilbraham in 1934 and renovated it over the next year, adding some units with kitchens. By the 21st century, the building was still mostly residential.

== Site ==
The Wilbraham is at the northwestern corner of 30th Street and Fifth Avenue in the Midtown South neighborhood of Manhattan in New York City, at the northern edge of the NoMad neighborhood. The land lot is rectangular and measures around 5,000 square feet (460 m^{2}), with a frontage of 40 feet (12 m) on Fifth Avenue and 125 feet (38 m) along 30th Street. To the south of the Wilbraham are the Marble Collegiate Church and old Holland House. Other nearby buildings include the Gilsey House to the west, the Grand Hotel on the same block to the northwest, the Hotel Wolcott on the same block to the north, the Colony Club building to the east, and the Church of the Transfiguration to the southeast.

During the mid-19th century, the stretch of Fifth Avenue between 23rd Street and 42nd Street had contained brownstones and mansions for some of New York City's wealthiest residents, as well as churches. Many hotels and social clubs opened in what is now NoMad following the opening of the Fifth Avenue Hotel in the 1850s, followed by apartment hotels, apartment buildings, Broadway theaters, and stores in the 1870s. The area's wealthiest residents moved uptown in the 1880s, but the neighborhood remained fashionable for clubs, hotels, and the first blocks of "French flats". When the Wilbraham opened in 1890, the surrounding area contained many Broadway theaters, men's clubs, Madison Square Garden, and Delmonico's restaurant. Even in the 21st century, the area contained a large number of apartment buildings, scattered among the commercial and office structures of the neighborhood.

== Architecture ==
The Wilbraham was designed by brothers David and John Jardine. It is eight stories under a verdigris copper-covered mansard roof. The building's design largely contains elements of the Romanesque Revival style, with elements of the Renaissance Revival style. Some parts of the design, such as rock-faced walls and round arches, were influenced by the Richardsonian Romanesque style developed by H.H. Richardson. The building also has a penthouse and a basement, though this is not included in the floor count.

=== Facade ===
The Wilbraham is clad in Philadelphia brick and brownstone from quarries in Belleville, New Jersey, with wrought- and cast iron, and has sash windows with wooden frames. The Fifth Avenue elevation of the facade is divided vertically into two bays, while the 30th Street elevation is divided into seven bays. On both elevations, the facade is divided horizontally into three sections: the base, midsection, and capital.

==== Lower stories ====
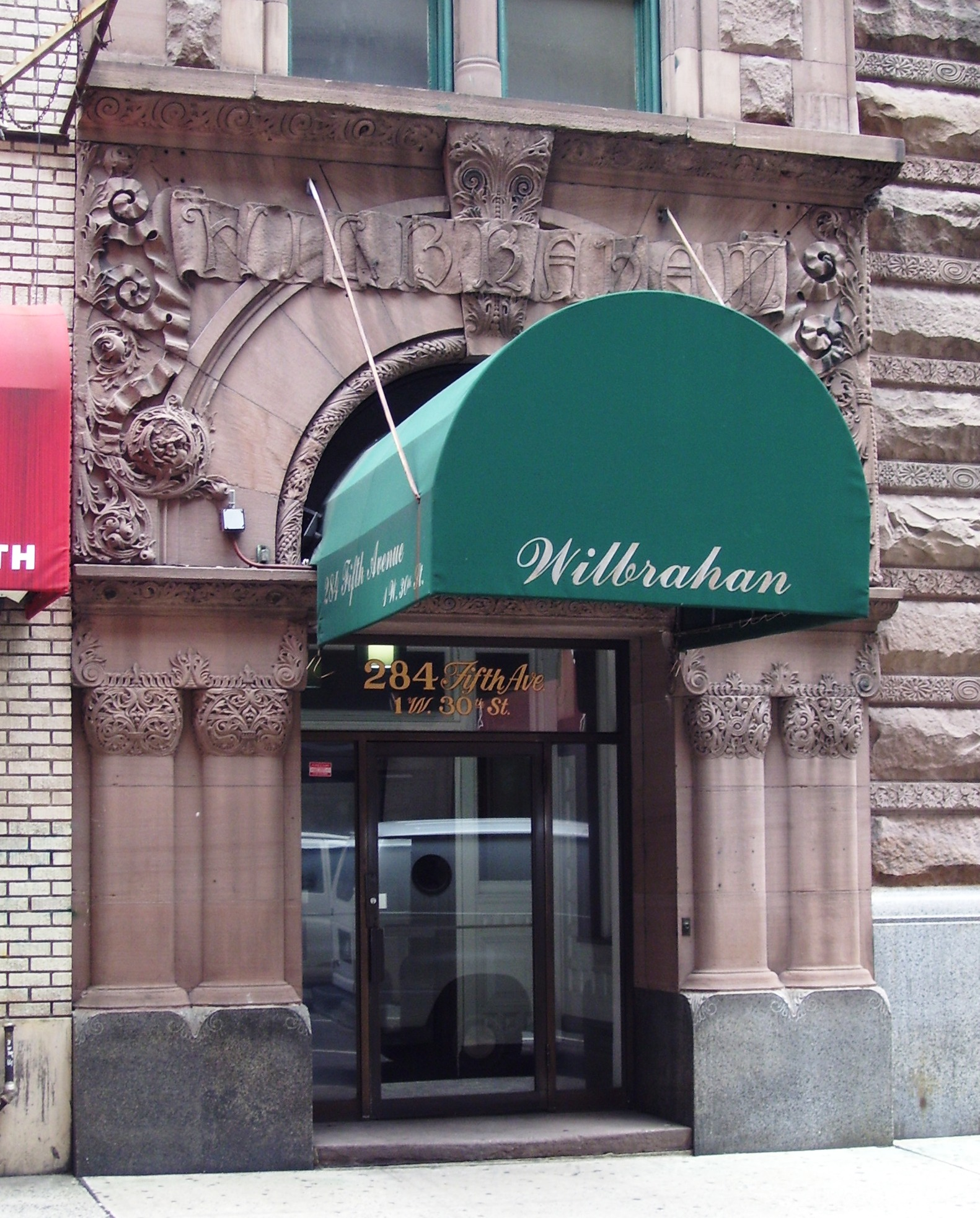
The entrance to the Wilbraham

The base is clad in rusticated blocks of brownstone, with alternating decorative bands and rock-faced stone, above a water table of gray polished granite. There are three pairs of bays (one on Fifth Avenue and two on 30th Street), which contain storefronts. On both elevations, the ground-story storefronts have been modified from their original design and are topped by canopies and sign boards. Some of the ground-story openings are covered with roller shutters.

On Fifth Avenue, the two bays are separated vertically by a granite-clad pier on the first story, as well as a half-column in the Composite order on the second story. The pier is veneered with tiles, which was installed around the mid-20th century. Rusticated piers are placed on either side of the facade; the capitals of these piers have carved foliate ornamentation and heads. When the Wilbraham was built, each of the ground-floor bays on Fifth Avenue had a door, a transom window above, and a display window beside the door. These have since been replaced with plate-glass display windows and metal-framed doors. Above the first story, each bay has a cast-iron spandrel with ribbons and patterned window sills, which is covered by a storefront sign. On the second story, each bay has two wood-framed windows, topped by a cornice made of stone and cast iron.

On the lowest two stories, the two easternmost bays on 30th Street are similar to those on Fifth Avenue, except that the display windows at ground story retain their original iron frames. The third and fourth bays from the east protrude slightly from the facade and are clad with rock-faced stone. There are round-arched openings on the first story and double windows on the second story of either bay. The arch in the third bay initially contained a stairway to the basement, which was topped by two windows; these were respectively replaced with service doors and a grille. A door in the fourth bay leads to the commercial space inside and is topped by a transom bar, a round-arched transom window, and a roller shutter. The fifth and sixth bays are designed similarly to those on Fifth Avenue, but they have masonry infill and metal grilles at ground level. The seventh (westernmost) bay contains a slightly protruding entrance to the apartments. The entrance is flanked by four colonettes with ornate capitals, which support a round arch with a foliate keystone and ornate spandrels. The name "Wilbraham" is carved in stylized letters above the arch. On the second story, the westernmost bay has a double window.

==== Upper stories ====
The third through sixth stories are clad in Philadelphia red brick. On these stories, each bay on Fifth Avenue has three windows per story, while each bay on 30th Street has two windows per story. On 30th Street, there are smaller windows on each story between the third and fourth bays, as well as between the fifth and sixth bays. The third and fourth bays have a fire escape and protrude slightly from the facade. The seventh bay on 30th Street also protrudes slightly from the facade. On the facade's western elevation, the top two stories are visible above the roof of an adjacent structure and are clad in painted brick.

The third through fifth stories have wood-framed sash windows with brownstone quoins on either side. The windows in each bay are separated by stone half-columns and flanked by colonnettes and keyed frames. There are stone spandrels with foliate decorations between each story. The third- and fifth-story windows have flat transoms, while the fourth-story windows have round arches. There are segmental-arched windows on the sixth story, with rubbed-brick piers on either side of each window. Stone cornices run above the fifth and sixth stories. The cornice above the fifth story contains keystones, dentils, and voussoirs, while the cornice above the sixth story has corbels and voussoirs. In the westernmost bay, there is a pediment above the window on the sixth story.

On the seventh and eighth stories, the windows are wood-framed sash windows. On the seventh story, each bay on Fifth Avenue has three windows, while each bay on 30th Street has one window. That story is clad in rock-faced ashlar with a band course above it. The eighth story is a mansard roof with paired dormer windows. The lower sections of each dormer are clad with rock facing, while the upper sections have egg-and-dart moldings. The mansard roof was originally made of slate with copper cresting, but it was later re-clad in standing seam copper. There are four brick chimneys above the roof, as well as a metal railing that runs around a roof garden. At the western end of the building is a penthouse that is set back from the street. The original masonry penthouse contained servants' rooms and was not counted as a full story; it was later replaced with a metal-and-masonry penthouse.

=== Interior ===
The Wilbraham retains much of its original layout, which is composed of storefronts and a lobby on the lowest two floors, as well as apartments on the third through eighth floors. The lobby is at the western side of the ground floor, while the storefronts occupy the eastern side of the ground floor and most of the second floor. An open staircase with a cast-iron balustrade and newel ascend from the western side of the lobby to the top floor and contains pink treads and landings. An elevator, to the north of the stairs, serves all floors. The original elevator by Otis Worldwide was manually operated, but it has since been replaced with a more modern unit. On each story, the rooms are connected by hallways that were originally paved in encaustic tiles.

The Wilbraham was intended to be fireproof. The building was originally supposed to have a cast-iron frame. The builders requested that the cast iron be substituted for steel in November 1888, after construction had begun. Despite receiving permission to add steel beams, the Wilbraham still used iron beams, although the party wall next to the building was reinforced. The Wilbraham also had its own power generator in the basement. The building's mechanical systems, such as plumbing, ventilation, electric and gas lighting, and heating systems, were advanced for their day. In addition, each tenant had housekeeping service, similar to in a short-term hotel, as well as an intercom that allowed them to talk to the building's superintendent.

==== Lobby and retail ====
The main entrance on 30th Street, described by an 1890 Real Estate Record and Guide article as "wide and spacious", leads to the lobby which retains its original layout. Originally, the entrance vestibule and main lobby had mosaic tiles, mahogany wainscoting, and decorative ceilings. A stained-glass window decorated the northern end of the lobby. The original tile floor and the stained-glass window have been removed, but the other decorations are intact. At the southeast corner of the lobby, just to the right of the main entrance, was a superintendent's room, which was subsequently converted into a mail room. Over the years, the mahogany and oak woodwork were painted over, but the original wooden decorations were being restored by 2017. There is also an Orientalist mural above the wainscoting in the lobby, which dates from no later than 1935.

The retail spaces occupy the eastern two-thirds of the first story and the majority of the second story. There is a showroom on the eastern side of the first story, which has plaster details, as well as cast-iron columns supporting a high ceiling. A second storefront exists along the center of the 30th Street frontage. There is additional commercial space on the second story, extending from Fifth Avenue westward to the elevator and staircase in the rear. The second-floor commercial space also has some decorative details such as plaster ornamentation and cast-iron columns.

==== Apartments ====
There were initially 42 apartments on the third through seventh floors, as well as five servants' quarters (three on the eighth floor and two in the penthouse). Each story had six apartments along the southern and eastern walls. Between 1934 and 1935, six apartments with kitchens were built across the third through seventh floors. In addition, two apartments were built within the penthouse, and an office was created by carving up the second floor. The units were arranged so they could be combined. By 2018, the spaces had been combined into 38 apartments.

On each of the third through eighth stories, the elevator opens onto a landing with encaustic floor tiles. A corridor, with acoustic carpets and paneled wood wainscoting, runs from each elevator landing to the eastern end of the building; each corridor has two sash windows overlooking a light court. Originally, the corridors were described as having mosaic tiles, polished-oak wainscoting, blue-painted walls above the wainscot, and hand-painted frescoes on the ceilings. There was also a communal dining room on the eighth floor, as the apartments originally did not have kitchens. The Real Estate Record described the dining room as having "separate tables and a handsome oak sideboard, with plate and crockery, the latter being artistic and evidently of Chinese or Japanese manufacture". The kitchen was placed on the top floor to minimize odors in each apartment. There was also a rooftop terrace; when the building opened, residents could see as far west as the North River (Hudson River) and as far east as Long Island.

The rooms measure as much as 33 by 18 feet (10.1 by 5.5 m) across and have thick walls and 13-foot (4.0 m) ceilings. Each "bachelor flat" consisted of a bedroom and parlor, as well as a bathroom. The parlors had mahogany fireplace mantels, tiled fireplaces with brass decorations, and ornate chandeliers. The floors in each apartment were made of timber with inlaid hardwood borders, and the spaces also had wallpaper and ceiling frescoes. A wide segmental arch led from the parlor to the bedroom in each apartment, and there were doors to adjacent units. There were electric lamps next to each bed. The bathrooms each faced either 30th Street or Fifth Avenue; they contained porcelain tubs and exposed metal pipes, which at the time were considered novel features. Residents decorated their apartments to their liking, so no two units were exactly the same. For instance, one of the earliest residents is described as having a fireplace with blue enamel tiles. Some of the apartments received kitchens as part of a renovation in the 1930s, but the original decorations were largely left alone.

== History ==
The Wilbraham was built as a bachelor flat (or bachelor apartment house), a type of multifamily residence that gained popularity in the late 19th century. This type of housing had become popular in New York City during the late 19th century, as the number of unmarried men in the city had grown significantly due to the city's industrialization and expansion. By 1890, forty-five percent of men older than 15 were unmarried, compared to thirteen percent just two decades prior. Although apartments in bachelor flats were meant for permanent residents, there were no kitchens in any of the apartments, making the bachelor flat akin to an apartment hotel. The bachelor flats only accepted men, hence their name, and the apartments were leased out to residents for a year at a time. When the Wilbraham was built in 1890, comparatively few bachelor flats existed in the city; a New York City Landmarks Preservation Commission survey found only four bachelor flats that predated the Wilbraham.

=== Development ===
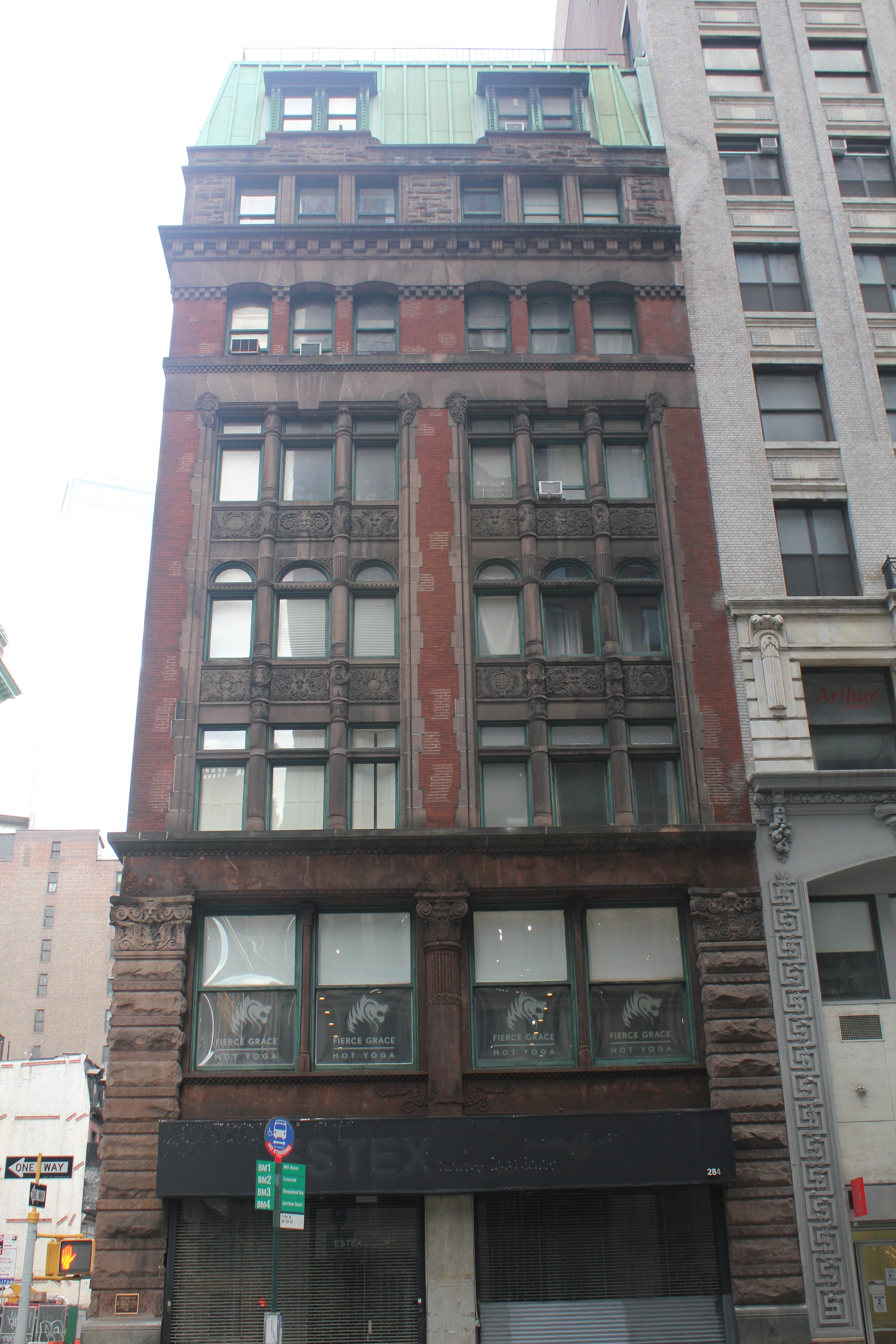
The building's Fifth Avenue facade

The building was commissioned as a speculative development by William Moir, a Scottish-American jeweler who was well known in the surrounding neighborhood in the late 19th century. Moir acquired a row house at the northwest corner of 30th Street and Fifth Avenue in early 1888. (Note: The Real Estate Record recorded the sale in March 1888. Landmarks Preservation Commission 2004, p. 5, gives a conflicting date of April 1888.) The four-story stone house had cost $235,000 to acquire and had previously belonged to John Watson. That July, the Real Estate Record reported that D. and J. Jardine had been hired to erect a "six-story and basement fire-proof structure" with stores on the first floor and bachelor apartments above. The Jardine brothers filed plans for a six-story bachelor flat in October; the structure would have a brick-and-brownstone facade with a fireproof frame of iron and cast iron. Work began shortly thereafter, and the cast iron beams in the frame were substituted with steel the next month. At the end of December 1888, William H. Moir is recorded as having transferred the plot at 30th Street and Fifth Avenue to his wife, Emily H. Moir.

Building magazine published a sketch of a six-story building on the site in January 1889; the structure was depicted with a balustrade on a parapet. That June, William Moir applied for a permit to construct two additional stories, including a mansard roof, because he wished to maximize the amount of rentable space that the city's building codes allowed. The additional stories were allowed because the Wilbraham and other bachelor flats were exempt from a city building code that prohibited most residential buildings from rising above 85 feet (26 m). The penthouse, which contained a kitchen and three servants' apartments, was added to the plans the next month. The building opened in May 1890. Davis Collamore & Co., the china and glass purveyors, leased the basement, ground-floor storefront, and second story when the Wilbraham opened. The Jardine brothers filed plans in October 1890 to build two rooms for servants within the penthouse, after Moir wrote to the New York City Department of Buildings that the rooms "are a positive necessity". The additional servants' rooms were finished in 1891.

=== Use as residential structure ===
John J. Gibbons, the leader of Davis Collamore & Co., bought the structure from Emily H. Moir at the beginning of January 1908 for $1 million. At the time, Gibbons believed that the building would continue to attract "high-class retail trade" because of its location on Fifth Avenue, which was easily accessible by public transportation. The Real Estate Record wrote that the sale "shows the growing necessity of tenants on the avenue owning their own property". Gibbons retained the upper stories as bachelor apartments. Davis Collamore & Co. moved out of the Wilbraham around 1920, when a new store was built at 15 East 56th Street. The Gibbons estate sold the building in 1927, at which point the building was valued at $850,000. The buyer was identified as the 1 West 30 St. Corporation. Simultaneously, the store and basement on 30th Street were leased to Emerald Chocolates Inc. for $670,000. The Wilbraham was one of several buildings in the neighborhood to be sold during that time, amid increases in the area's real-estate values.

Although the building continued to be classified as a "bachelor apartment", a 1929 directory had listings for 15 women and 10 men who lived there. Among the Wilbraham's residents were Wilton Lackaye, who died there in 1932. The Metropolitan Life Insurance Company took over the building in 1934 after the previous owner failed to pay taxes. Metropolitan Life filed alteration plans for the Wilbraham at a projected cost of $50,000. Several units with kitchens were added, making the Wilbraham likely the first apartment building on the midtown section of Fifth Avenue with gas stoves. Many of the building's existing residents were forced to relocate. By then, many of the nearby residential structures, such as the Holland House, the Knickerbocker, and the Cambridge, had either been converted to offices or demolished. D. Everett Waid and Emery Roth designed the renovation of the building. The alterations were completed in August 1935 by the firm of Bing & Bing, who divided the nine residential floors into apartments with one or two rooms.

Maxwell Handelsman acquired the building in June 1944 from Metropolitan Life; the buyer paid cash and took a mortgage of $242,500. Over the years, the building was sold several more times. By 1968, The New York Times described the Wilbraham as "a friendly building with overtones of the publishing world, genteel old ladies and young career women". There were rumors that Lillian Russell and Diamond Jim Brady lived at the Wilbraham, although these rumors could not be proven. At the time, a management firm and a carpet store occupied the lower stories. The structure was known as the Tiffany by 1984. The New York City Landmarks Preservation Commission designated the Wilbraham as an official city landmark in 2004. By that decade, the building operated as a housing cooperative. The building was added to the National Register of Historic Places in 2018.

== Critical reception ==
The Real Estate Record and Guide in 1890 called the Wilbraham "certainly the 'crack' apartment house of its kind in New York City...quite an imposing piece of architecture". According to the magazine, it was "the most elegantly appointed among the bachelor apartment houses in New York City". The New York Times wrote in 1968 that the building was one of "Manhattan's most romantic and most improbable apartment houses". In designating the building as a landmark in 2004, the LPC wrote that "the Wilbraham is extraordinarily well-detailed and reflects the influence of the Romanesque Revival style in the rock-faced stonework and excellent, intricately carved stone detail". In 2020, The New York Times characterized the Wilbraham and the nearby Holland House building as "providing texture to the historic fabric" along the southern end of Fifth Avenue.

== See also ==
- Architecture in New York City
- List of New York City Designated Landmarks in Manhattan from 14th to 59th Streets
- National Register of Historic Places listings in Manhattan from 14th to 59th Streets
