= Darling Estate Historic District =

Historic district in Vermont, United States

- U.S. National Register of Historic Places
- U.S. Historic district
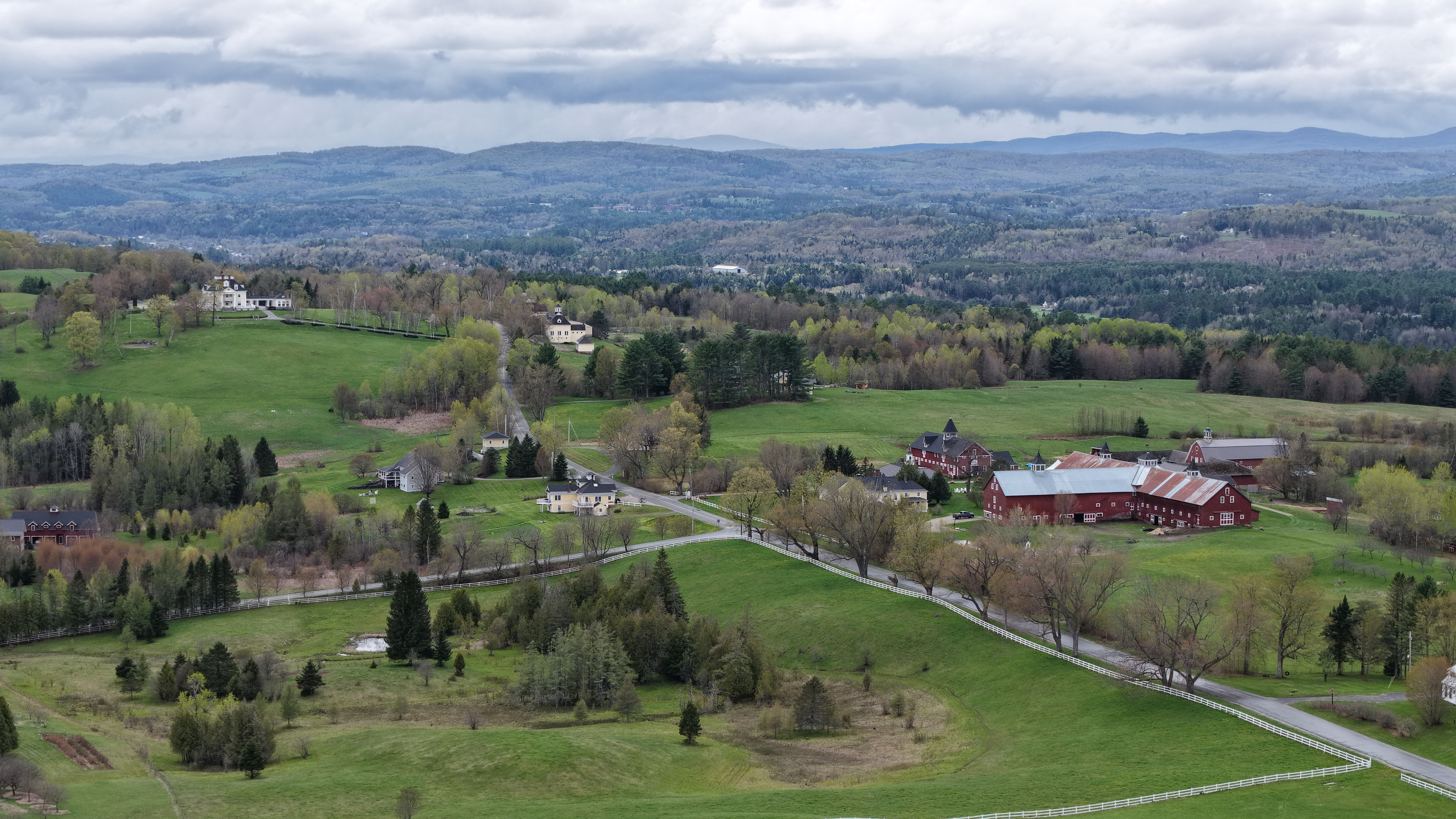
- Darling Hill, VT, from the northeast

- Location within Vermont Location within the United States
- Location: Darlington Hill Rd., Burke and Lyndon, Vermont
- Coordinates: 44°35′4″N 71°57′49″W
- Area: 2,040 acres (830 ha)
- Built: 1810
- Architect: Jardine, Kent & Jardine
- Architectural style: Greek Revival; Neo-Georgian
- NRHP reference No.: 10000911
- Added to NRHP: August 23, 2011

The Darling Estate Historic Estate encompasses an historic country estate of more than 2,000 acres (810 ha) on Darling Hill Road, straddling the town line between Burke and Lyndon, Vermont. Built in the early 1900s for Elmer Darling, a locally-born New York hotelier, it was one of Vermont's largest such estates, featuring Burklyn Hall, one of its most opulent Colonial Revival houses, as well as numerous 19th-century farm properties. It was listed on the National Register of Historic Places in 2011.

== Description and history ==
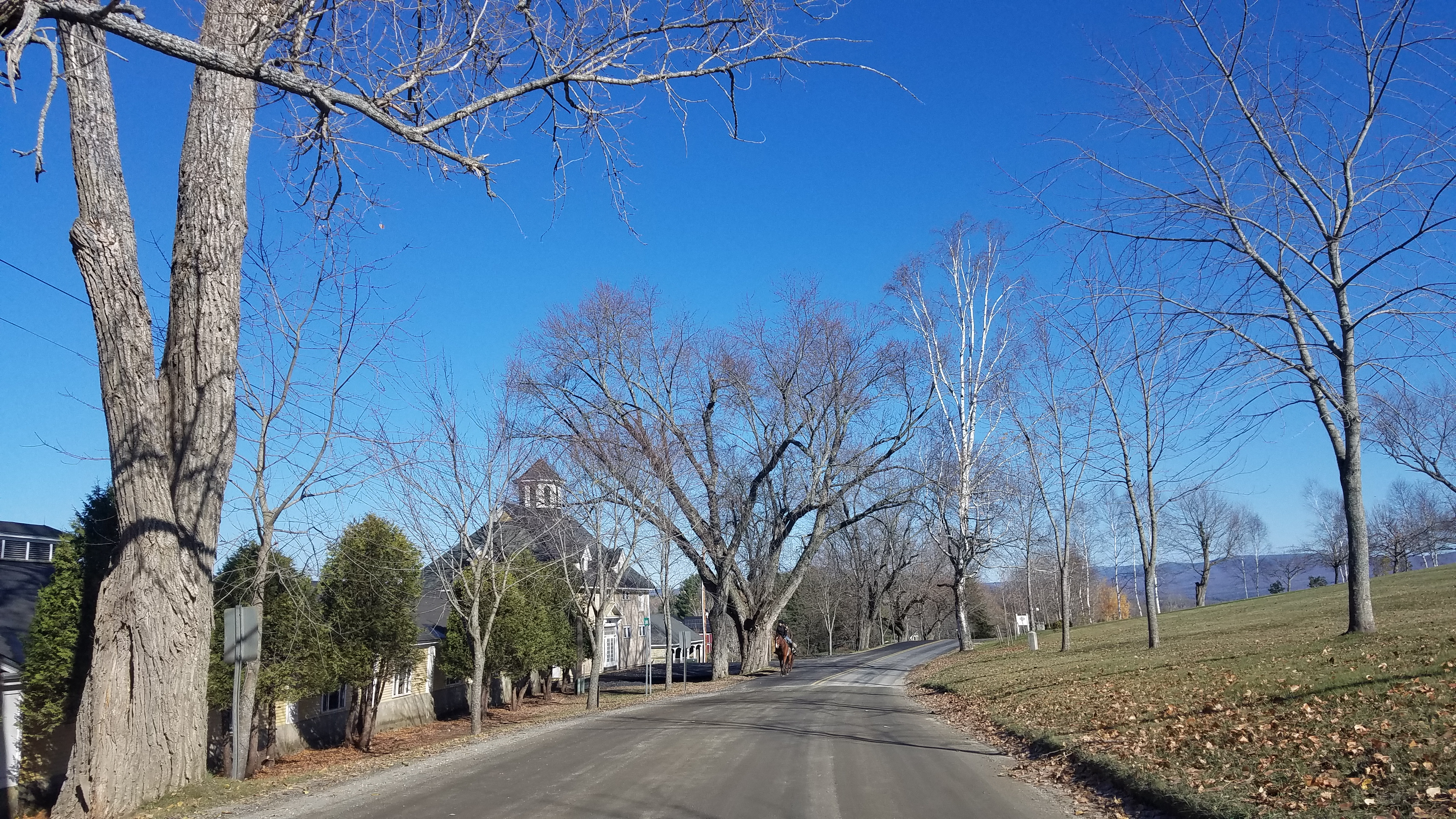
Darling Hill Road near the Estate in late October

Elmer Darling, a native of Burke, made a fortune operating the Fifth Avenue Hotel in New York City. He began purchasing properties on Darling Hill (then known as Bemis) in 1883, and had by the early 20th century amassed more than 2,000 acres of farmland encompassing an entire ridge north of Lyndon and west of East Burke. Properties on this ridge had largely begun has hill farms in the early 19th century, and Darling's purchases included farm buildings spanning the 19th century in age. Darling transformed this area into a gentleman's farm, which was primarily operated out of Mountain View Farm, located at junction of Darling Hill and East Darling Hill Roads. In the 1890s Darling built a state-of-the-art creamery, and later expanded into the breeding of Morgan horses. He had all of the older farm buildings restored, and lined Darling Hill Road with a canopy of trees that is still largely in place. Darling died here in 1931, and his heirs sold off the Mountain View Farm in 1960.

Burklyn Hall is located at the highest point of the Darling Hill ridge, which extends north–south in northeastern Lyndon and southern Burke. The house is a large three-story wood-frame structure resting on a granite foundation. Its main section is square, covered by a hip roof with gabled dormers and a balustraded widow's walk at the center. Projecting south along the ridge is a long ell. The main entrance faces north, under a massive two-story Greek temple facade, and a porte-cochère on the west side is joined to an outbuilding housing a lavishly decorated billiard room. The interior, in particular the four great rooms of the main floor, feature elaborate carved woodwork and plaster moldings. There are formal gardens just south of the hall, separating it from a small conservatory. The hall is named for its position on the town line, and was designed by the architectural firm Jardine, Kent & Jardine and built in 1904–08. It features amenities not normally found in domestic architecture of the period, including elevators and a central vacuuming system.

== See also ==
- National Register of Historic Places listings in Caledonia County, Vermont
