= David and John Jardine =

American architectural firm

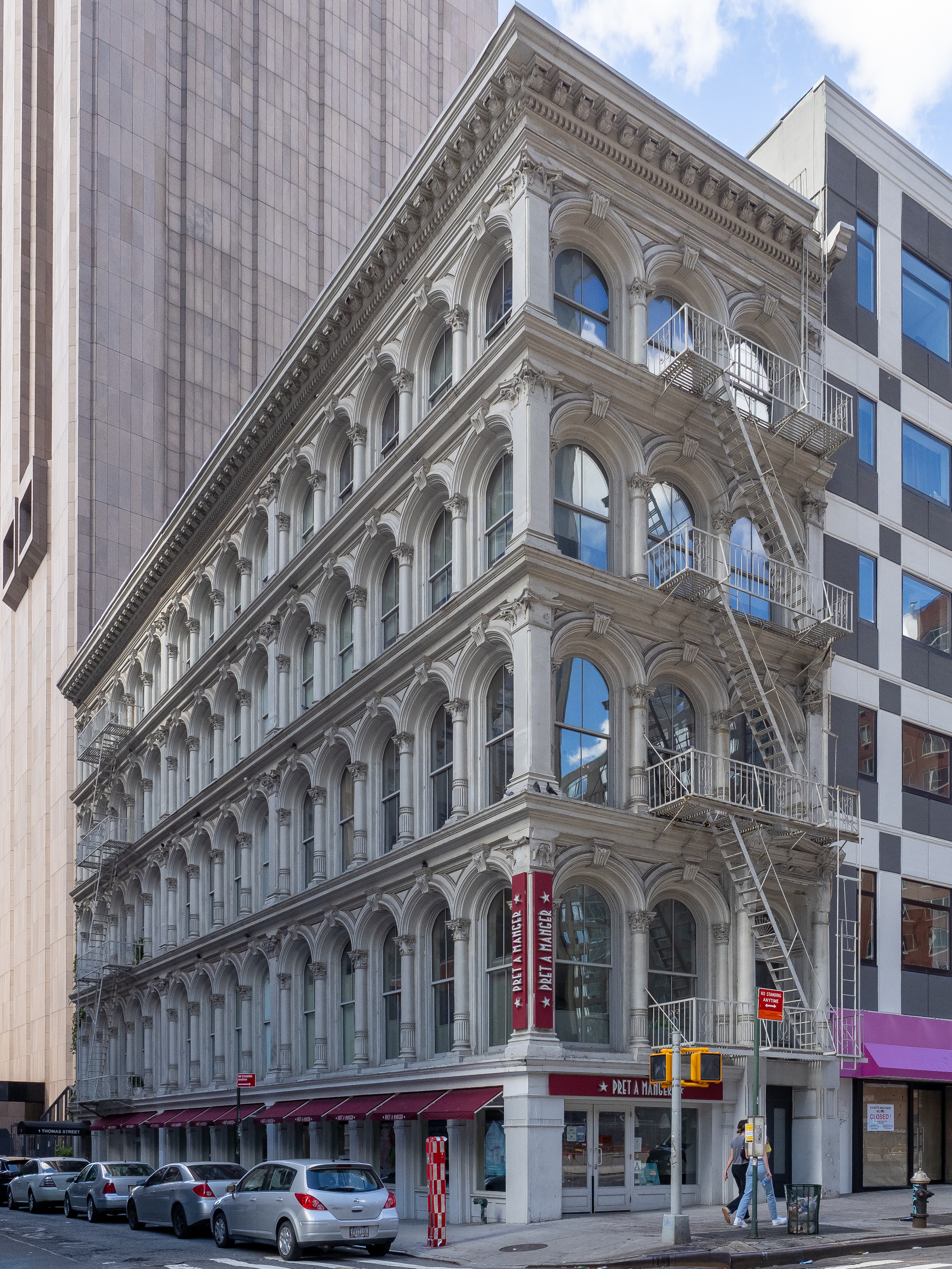
319 Broadway in New York City, designed by D. & J. Jardine in the Italianate style and completed in 1870.

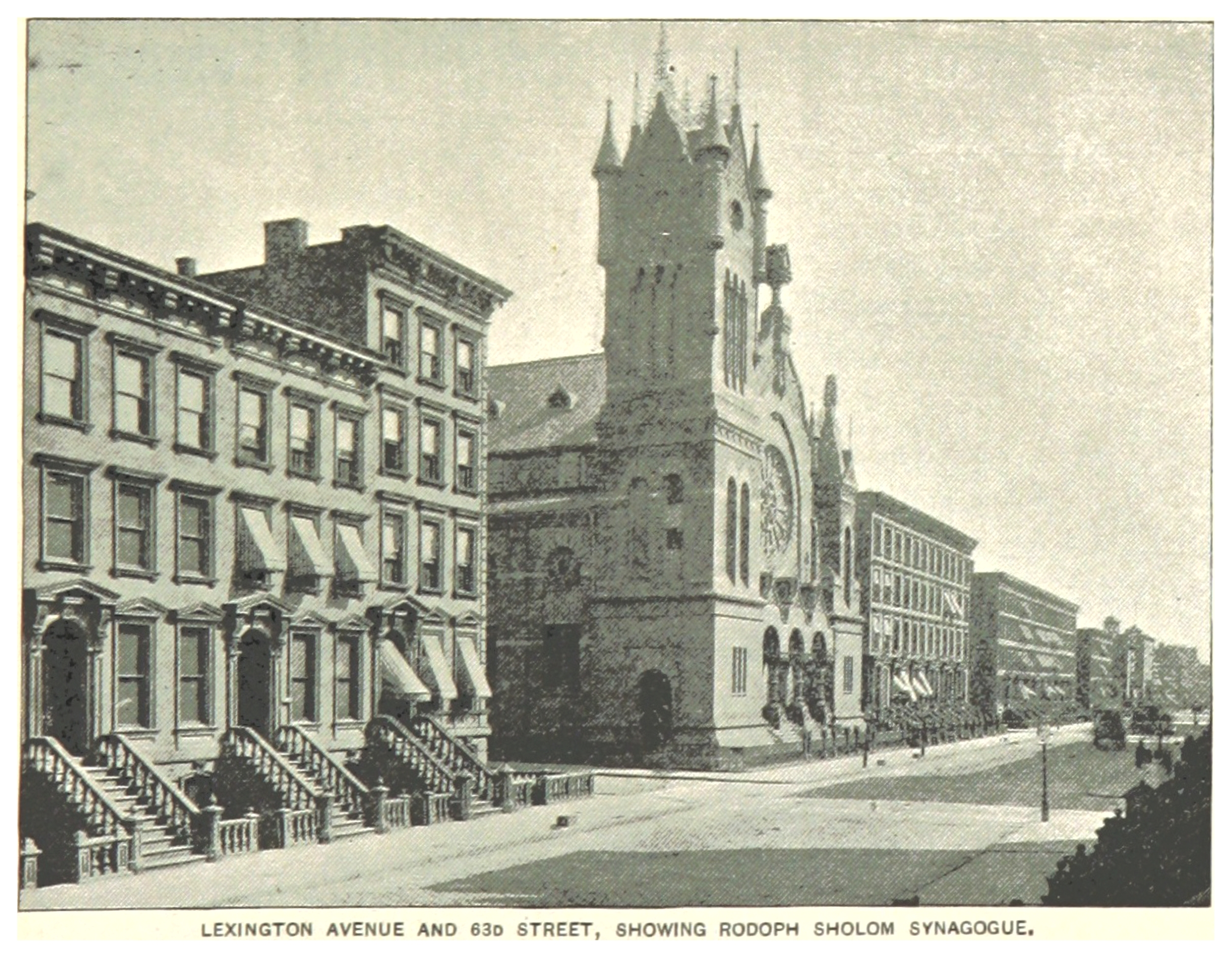
The former synagogue of Temple Beth-El and Congregation Rodeph Sholom in New York City, designed by D. & J. Jardine in the High Victorian Gothic style and completed in 1873.

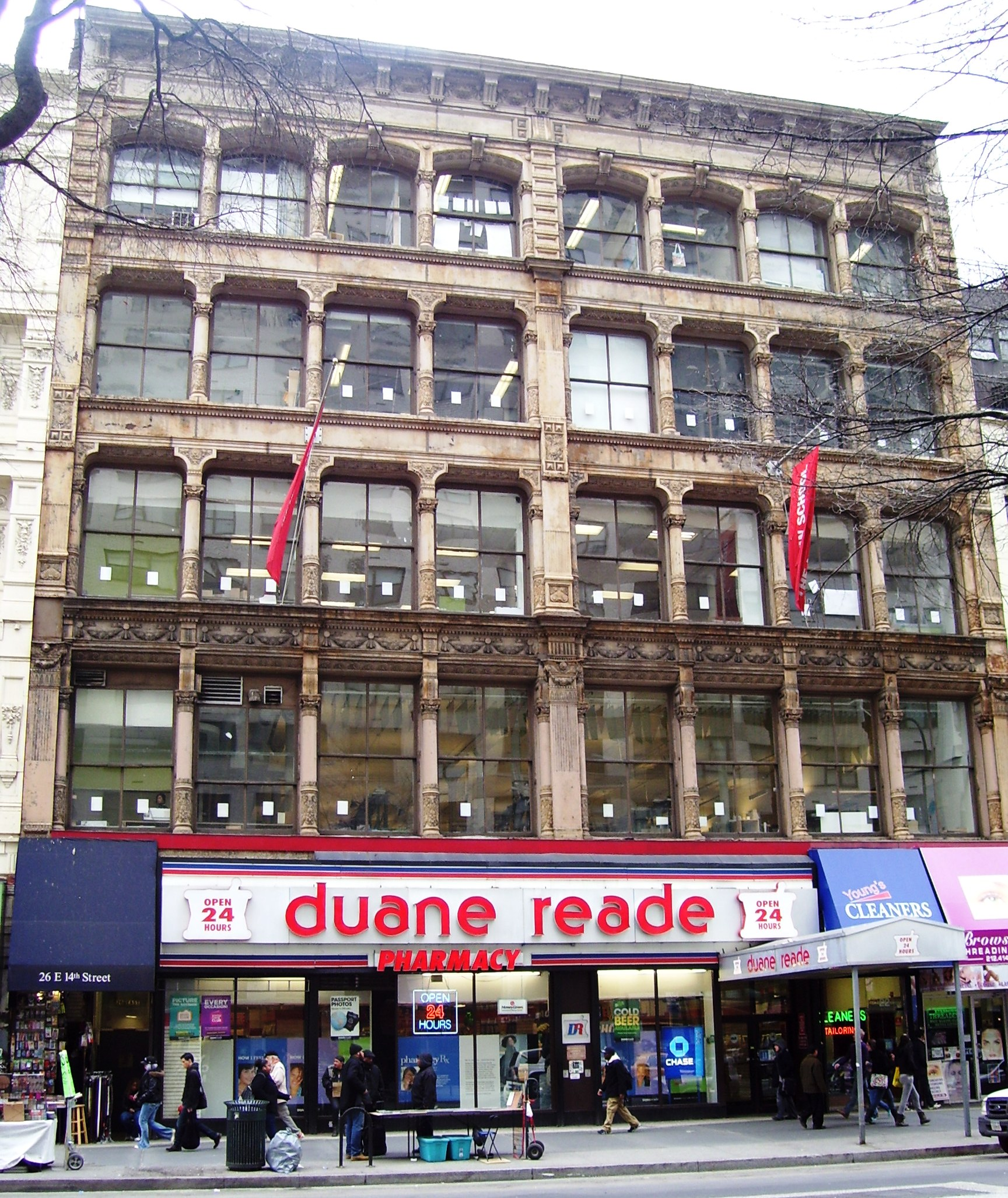
The Baumann Brothers building in New York City, designed by D. & J. Jardine in an eclectic style and completed in 1880.

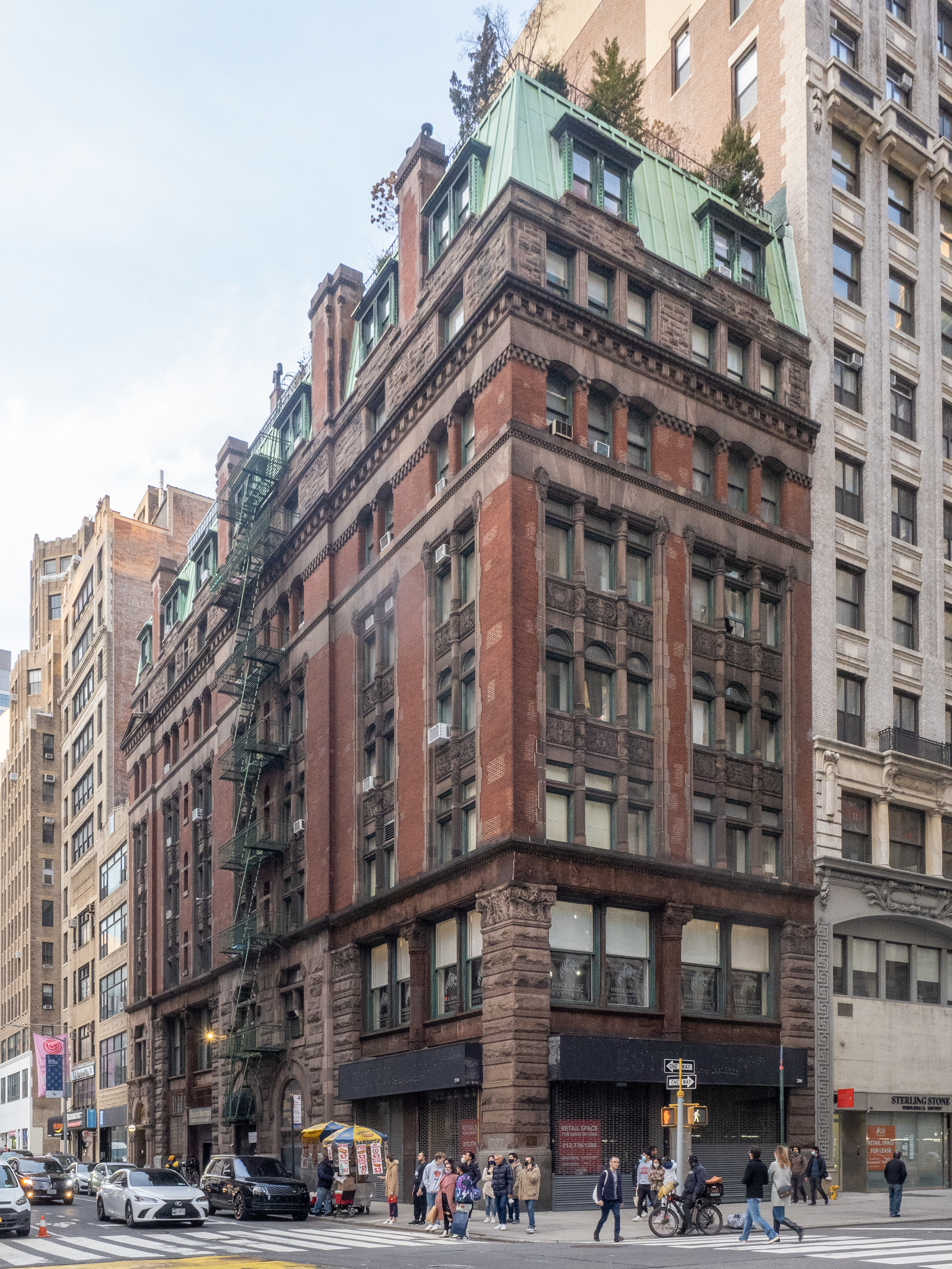
The Wilbraham in New York City, designed by D. & J. Jardine in the Richardsonian Romanesque style and completed in 1890.

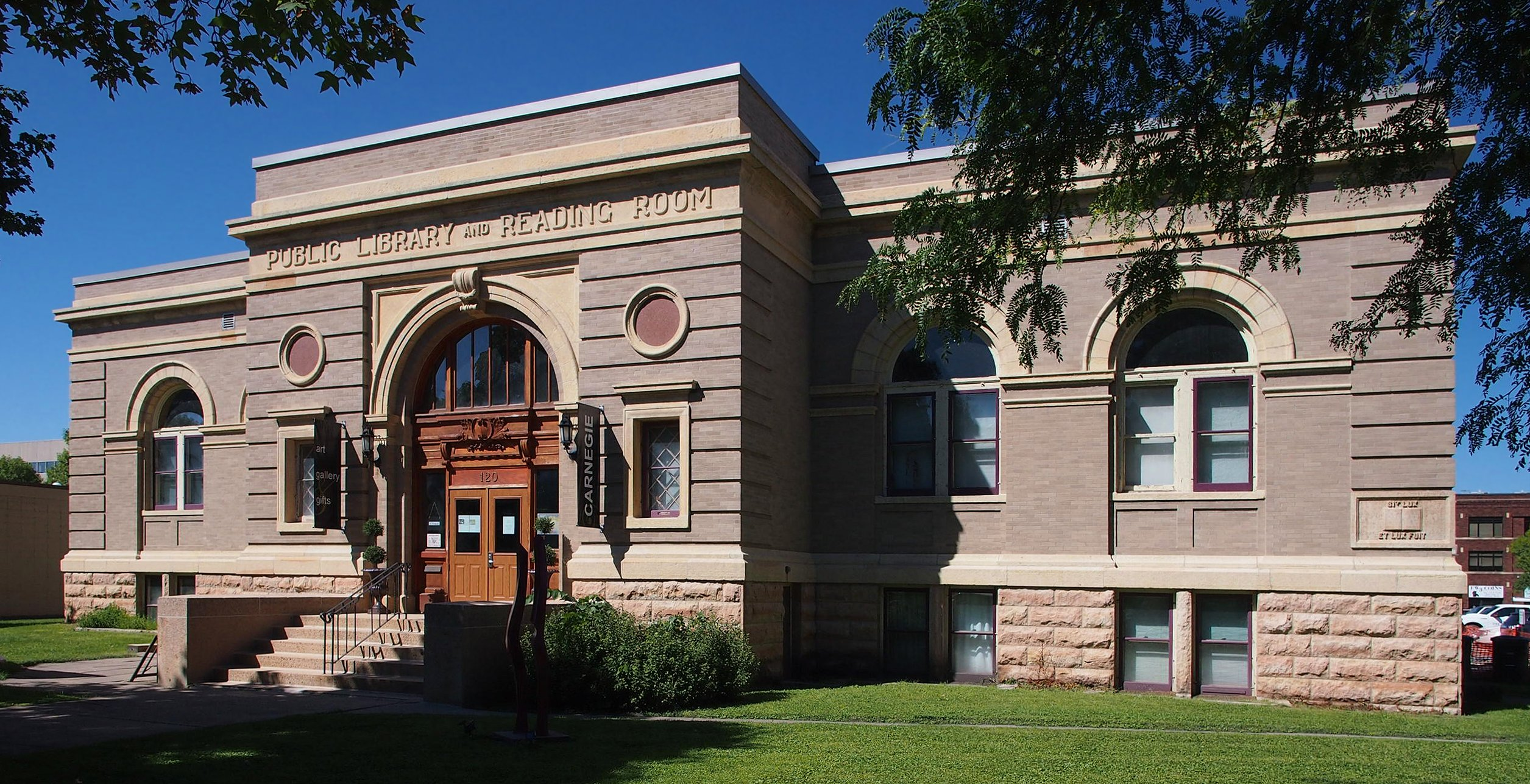
The former Mankato Public Library and Reading Room in Mankato, Minnesota, designed by Jardine, Kent & Jardine in the Italian Renaissance Revival style and completed in 1903.

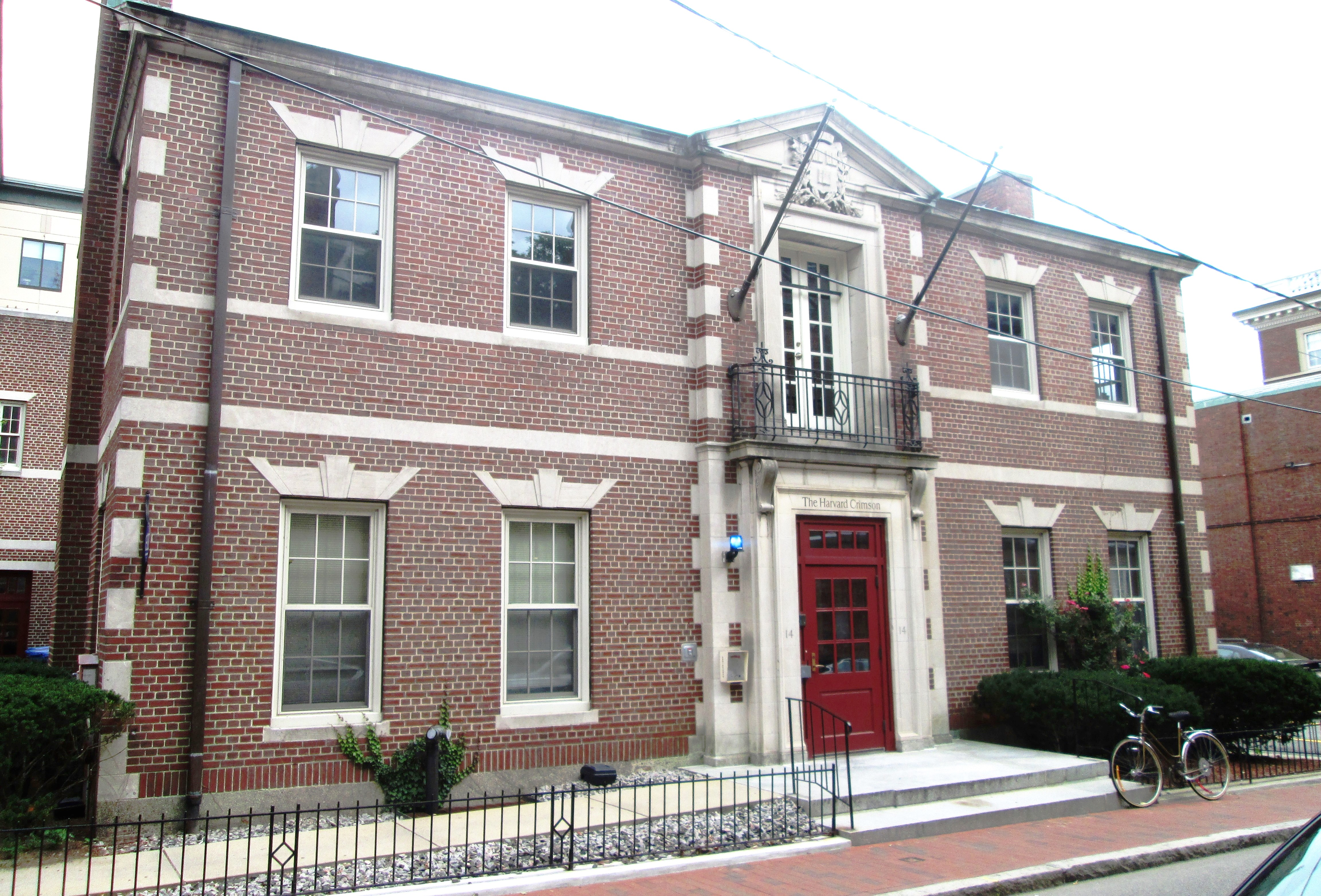
The Harvard Crimson building in Cambridge, Massachusetts, designed by Jardine, Hill & Murdock in the Colonial Revival style and completed in 1915.

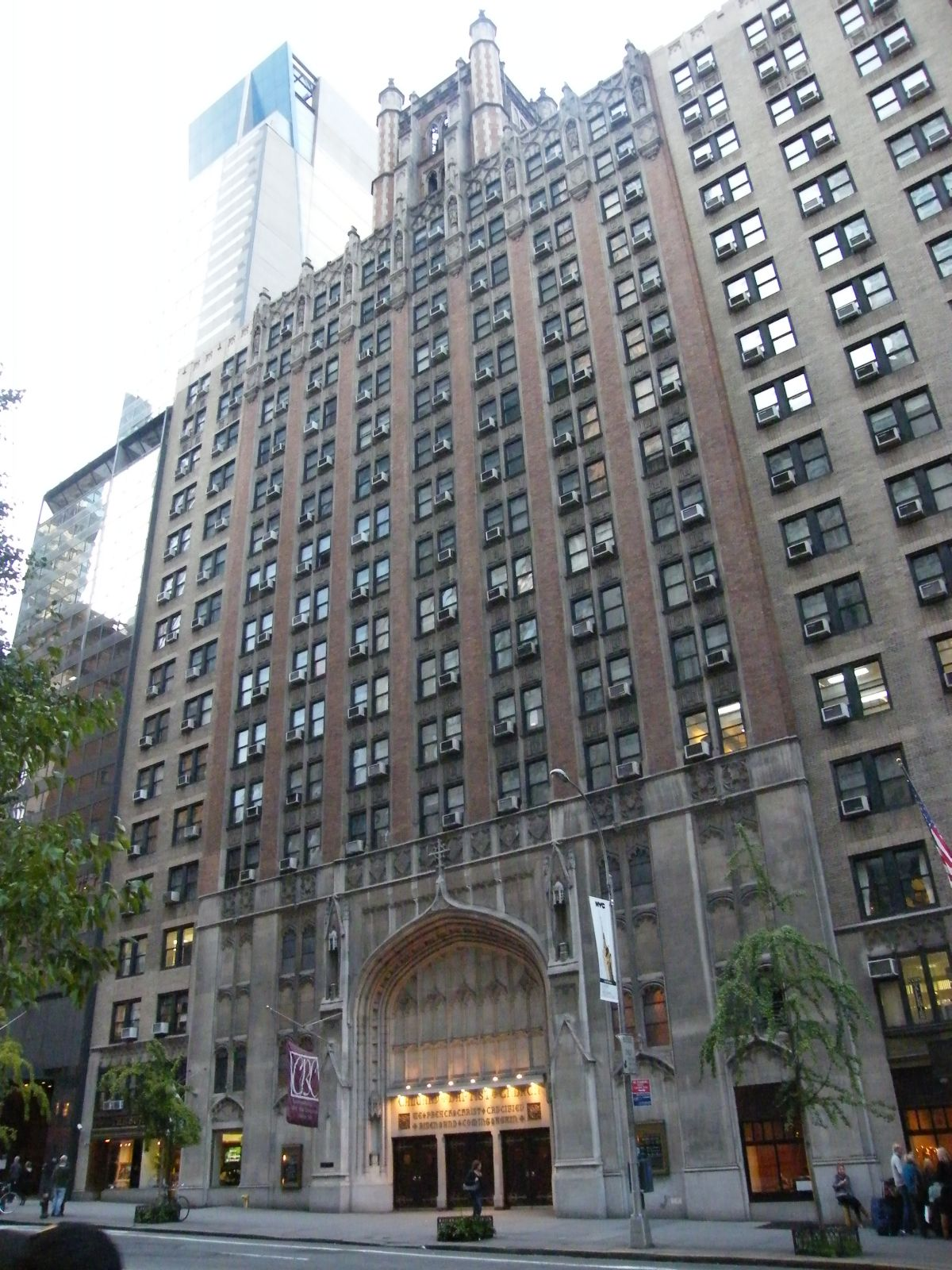
The former Calvary Baptist Church and Salisbury Hotel in New York City, designed by Jardine, Hill & Murdock in the Gothic Revival style and completed in 1931.

The brothers David Jardine (July 1, 1840 – June 4, 1892) and John Jardine (1838 – June 23, 1920) were Scottish-born American architects in practice in New York City. After immigrating to the United States in 1850, David Jardine opened an office in 1855. In 1865 he and brother John Jardine formed the partnership of D. & J. Jardine, which would become "one of the more prominent, prolific and versatile architectural firms in the city in the second half of the 19th century". After the death of David Jardine, the firm was continued by his brothers and their partners under the names Jardine, Kent & Jardine, Jardine, Kent & Hill, Jardine, Hill & Murdock and Jardine, Murdock & Wright. It was dissolved c. 1941, after about 86 years of continuous practice.

== History ==
The Jardine brothers were born near Whithorn, Wigtownshire, Scotland, to Archibald Jardine, an architect and builder, and were trained by him. David Jardine was the first to immigrate to the United States in 1850. In 1855 he opened an architect's office of his own in New York City. For a few years before the American Civil War he worked in partnership with Edward G. Thompson under the name Jardine & Thompson. During the war John Jardine immigrated. He spent the war designing several monitors and gunboats for the Union Army. The brothers formed their partnership in 1865. They were joined in 1872 by J. H. Van Norden and in 1884 by a third brother, George E. Jardine, as unnamed partners. David died in June 1892 at the age of 51. John and George, with William W. Kent, reorganized the firm as Jardine, Kent & Jardine. Kent had previously been associated with Henry Hobson Richardson and Heins & LaFarge and had practiced in Buffalo with his brother, Edward Austin Kent. George died in 1902 at the age of 51, though the name of the firm was not changed.

All three Jardine brothers were members of the Saint Andrew's Society of the State of New York. John Jardine served as second vice president for 1898 and as first vice president for 1899, the first year of Andrew Carnegie's presidency. This connection to Carnegie may explain how Jardine, Kent & Jardine was commissioned to design Carnegie libraries in Minnesota, New Jersey, Pennsylvania and Washington.

In 1909 John and Kent were joined by Clinton Murdock Hill, an architect who had previously been a partner in the Boston firms of Bacon & Hill and Hill & James. The work of the latter includes Aigremont (1907), a country house in Winchester, Massachusetts. In December 1910 they were joined by his cousin, Harris Hunnewell Murdock, a Harvard graduate and a former director and vice president of the Library Bureau. In 1911 the firm was renamed Jardine, Kent & Hill to reflect Hill's partnership. That firm was active in the rebuilding of downtown Bangor, Kent's hometown, after its Great Fire. Kent retired from practice in 1912 and the firm was renamed Jardine, Hill & Murdock. In 1920 John Jardine committed suicide. He had suffered from depression and had not been active in the firm for some time. This left designer Hill and business manager Murdock as the sole surviving partners. Hill died in 1930, and the firm was renamed Jardine, Murdock & Wright to include William H. Wright. In 1932 Joseph V. McKee, acting mayor of New York City, appointed Murdock chair of the Board of Standards and Appeals. The duties of his new position soon obligated his retirement from professional practice. The firm continued under Wright until at least 1941. Murdock continued as chair of the Board of Standards and Appeals until his death in 1959, having been reappointed by succeeding city administrations. In 1943 he had been elected a Fellow of the American Institute of Architects in recognition of his public service. He was the only principal of the firm to receive the honor.

== Legacy ==
At least six works by the Jardine firm have been listed on the United States National Register of Historic Places, four of which have also been designated New York City Landmarks. Two additional works are solely New York City Landmarks.

The papers of John Jardine and his son, John E. Jardine, are conserved at the North Baker Research Library of the California Historical Society.

== Buildings ==
=== D. & J. Jardine, 1865–1892 ===
- 1865 – Loft building, 71 Thomas St, New York City
- 1866 – Fifth Avenue Baptist Church, 8 W 46th St, New York City
  - Built for what is now the Riverside Church congregation. Demolished.
- 1867 – Loft building, 540 Broadway, New York City
- 1870 – Office building, 319 Broadway, New York City
  - A New York City Landmark.
- 1872 – Madison Avenue Presbyterian Church, 506 Madison Ave, New York City
  - Demolished.
- 1873 – Henry Knickerbocker house, 1 E 64th St, New York City
  - Later owned by George Crocker, and remodeled for him circa 1899 by Brite & Bacon. Demolished.
- 1873 – Temple Beth-El, Lexington Ave and E 63rd St, New York City
  - Sold to Congregation Rodeph Sholom in 1891 and demolished in 1926.
- 1874 – Harlem Presbyterian Church, 43 E 125th St, New York City
  - Demolished.
- 1874 – Loft building, 678 Broadway, New York City
  - One of a pair of cast iron commercial structures for General Thomas Davies.
- 1877 – B. Altman and Company department store, 625 Sixth Ave, New York City
- 1880 – Baumann Brothers Furniture and Carpets Store, 22-26 E 14th St, New York City
  - A New York City Landmark.
- 1881 – Loft building, 478 W Broadway, New York City
  - NRHP-listed, also a New York City Landmark.
- 1882 – Church of the Incarnation, Episcopal, reconstruction, 209 Madison Ave, New York City
- 1883 – Cornell Memorial Methodist Episcopal Church, 231 E 76th St, New York City
  - Demolished.
- 1883 – Emmanuel Baptist Church, 47 Suffolk St, New York City
  - Demolished.
- 1883 – Loft building, 150 Beekman St, New York City
- 1890 – The Wilbraham, 284 Fifth Ave, New York City
  - NRHP-listed, also a New York City Landmark.

=== Jardine, Kent & Jardine, 1892–1911 ===
- 1896 – Equitable Life Assurance Society of the United States branch office, 252 W 138th St, New York City
- 1903 – East Orange Public Library (former), 221 Freeway Dr E, East Orange, New Jersey
  - A Carnegie library.
- 1903 – Easton Area Public Library, 515 Church St, Easton, Pennsylvania
  - A Carnegie library.
- 1903 – Mankato Public Library and Reading Room (former), 120 S Broad St, Mankato, Minnesota
  - ** A Carnegie library, NRHP-listed.
- 1903 – Tacoma Public Library, 1102 Tacoma Ave, Tacoma, Washington
  - A Carnegie library.
- 1903 – Tenement house, 14 Christopher St, New York City
- 1904 – Van Tassell and Kearney Horse Auction Mart, 126-128 E 13th St, New York City
  - NRHP-listed, also a New York City Landmark.
- 1908 – Elmer Darling estate, Burklyn Hall, Darling Hill Rd, Burke, Vermont
  - NRHP-listed, also a contributing resource to the NRHP-listed Darling Estate Historic District.

=== Jardine, Kent & Hill, 1911–1912 ===
- 1911 – Pearl Building, 8 Harlow St, Bangor, Maine
  - A contributing resource to the NRHP-listed Great Fire of 1911 Historic District.
- 1912 – American Jersey Cattle Club (former), 324 W 23rd St, New York City
  - Built for the predecessor of the American Jersey Cattle Association, now based in Reynoldsburg, Ohio.
- 1912 – Bangor Railway and Electric Company substation, 144 Park St, Bangor, Maine
  - A contributing resource to the NRHP-listed Great Fire of 1911 Historic District.

=== Jardine, Hill & Murdock, 1912–1930 ===
- 1912 – Bacon & Robinson Building, 15 State St, Bangor, Maine
  - A contributing resource to the NRHP-listed Great Fire of 1911 Historic District.
- 1915 – Harvard Crimson building, 14 Plympton St, Cambridge, Massachusetts
- 1930 – The Sofia, 43 W 61st St, New York City
  - NRHP-listed, also a New York City Landmark.
- 1931 – Calvary Baptist Church and Salisbury Hotel, 123 W 57th St, New York City
  - Demolished in 2022.
- 1931 – Madison Avenue Baptist Church and Roger Williams Hotel, 129 Madison Ave, New York City
