= 319 Broadway =

Commercial building in Manhattan, New York

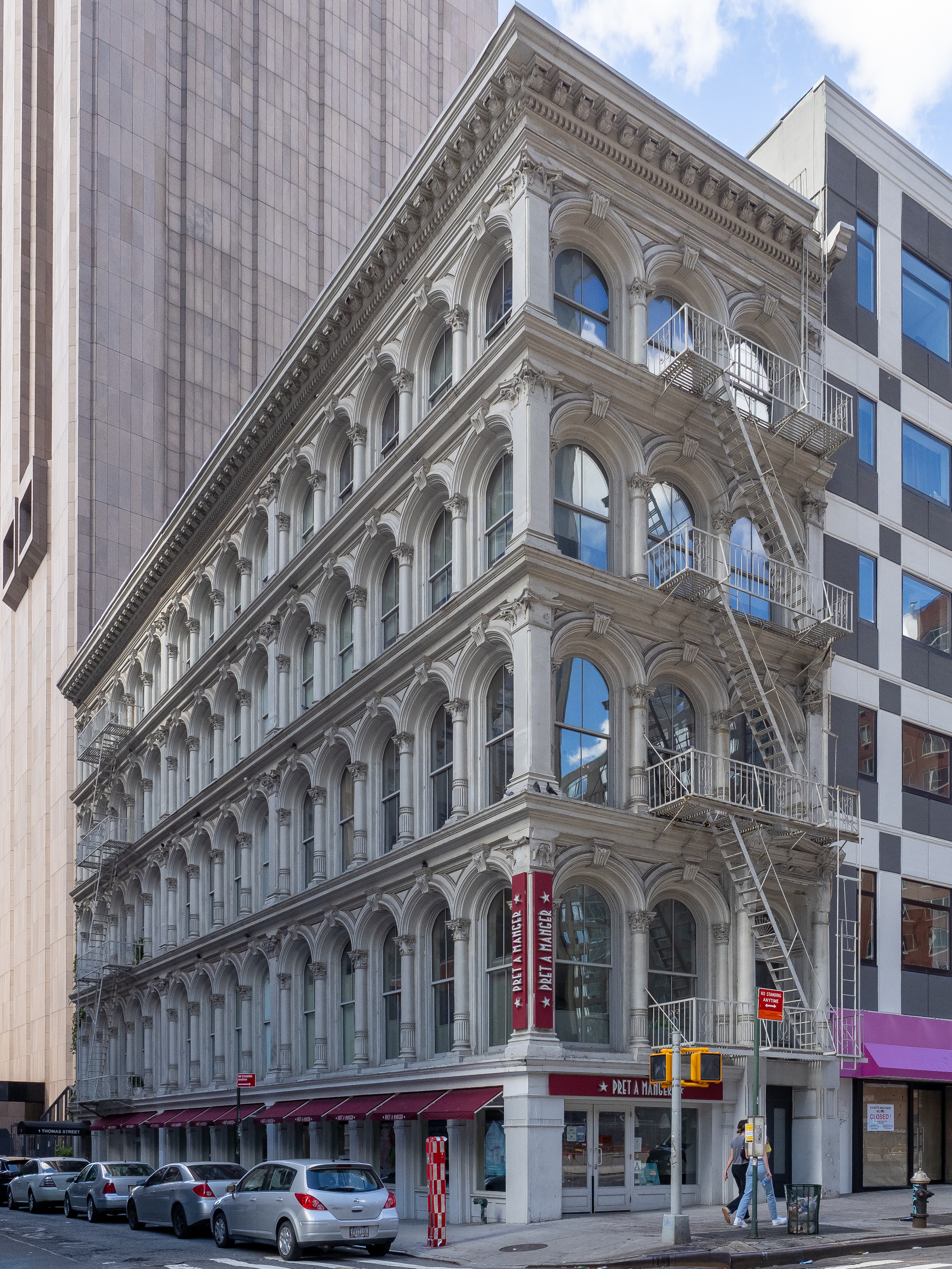
- Interactive map of the 319 Broadway area

General information
- Type: Commercial
- Location: 319 Broadway at Thomas Street, TriBeCa, Manhattan, New York City
- Coordinates: 40°42′57″N 74°00′19″W
- Construction started: 1869
- Completed: 1870

Height
- Roof: 55.38 ft (16.88 m)

Technical details
- Floor count: 5

Design and construction
- Architect: David and John Jardine

New York City Landmark
- Designated: August 29, 1989
- Reference no.: 1650

319 Broadway, also known as the Metropolitan Life Insurance Company Home Office, is a five-story office building on the corner of Broadway and Thomas Street in the Tribeca neighborhood of Manhattan in New York City. It is a cast-iron building in the Italianate architecture style, built in 1869–70 and designed by D. & J. Jardine. It is the lone survivor of a pair of buildings at 317 and 319 which were known as the "Thomas Twins". The cast iron for these mirror-twin buildings was provided by Daniel D. Badger's Architectural Iron Works. The building became a New York City designated landmark on August 29, 1989.

== History ==
The site of 319 Broadway, at the northwest corner of Thomas Street and Broadway, was previously owned by the New York Hospital, which sat adjacent to the property. In 1869, the Union Army general and real-estate developer Thomas Alfred Davies leased two lots flanking Thomas Street from the Society of New York Hospital, commissioning the firm of D. & J. Jardine to design a cast-iron building for each lot.

The two buildings faced each other until 1971, when 317 Broadway was torn down. Early tenants of 319 Broadway included the Security State Bank and the Metropolitan Life Insurance Corporation. Above the first story, 319 Broadway remains similar to the way it looked at the time of its construction. The stoop was removed in 1912, along with sidewalk encumbrances. Around that time, the basement level was designated as the first story, which classified the building as a five-story structure. The building continues to house offices and a restaurant.

== Description ==
The Italianate-style building extends 25 feet (7.6 m) along Broadway and 105 feet (32 m) along Thomas Street. Faced in cast iron, the building contains many original two-over-two wood sash windows.

The Broadway elevation originally contained a stoop at the north and two openings with flattened arches and a corner pier. This pattern was continued on the Thomas Street elevation. Plate glass windows have replaced the flat-arched openings on Broadway, and the first story of the Thomas Street elevation has been largely enclosed by a building addition, although the arched openings are still present. On Broadway, the second through fifth floors have one bay containing three window openings. The north opening of the second floor contains a slightly projecting portico with flanking engaged columns supporting a triangular pediment and brackets with incised neo-Grec ornament, which is likely a later replacement. This opening contains a single-pane window with a decorative metal fanlight above.

All of the windows are arched and capped by a scrolled keystone and flanked by Corinthian columns. A pilaster marks the south corner. Stories three through five contain three window openings each, gradually decreasing in size, flanked by Corinthian columns and terminated by piers at each end supporting a cornice. The center window on the fourth floor contains paired glass doors installed in recent years, leading to a fire escape containing wrought-iron filigree extending from the second story to the fifth. The roof is surmounted by a projecting cornice containing dentils and scrolled brackets.

The Thomas Street elevation is similar to that on Broadway. It has three bays; the outer two containing five window openings per story and the center bay with four, each bay separated by Corinthian piers. With the exception of the two western openings and the eastern opening, articulated by flattened arches, the first floor has been enlarged since the building's construction. At the base of the service entrance, a metal plaque reads "Architectural Iron Works / 14th Street between / A B & C NY." Above the service entrance, each window contains an arched transom with paired wood sash windows. The rear wall, adjacent to the Thomas Street elevation, is covered with gray stucco.

== See also ==
- List of New York City Designated Landmarks in Manhattan below 14th Street
