= Burklyn Hall =

Historic house in Vermont, United States

- U.S. National Register of Historic Places
- U.S. Historic district – Contributing property
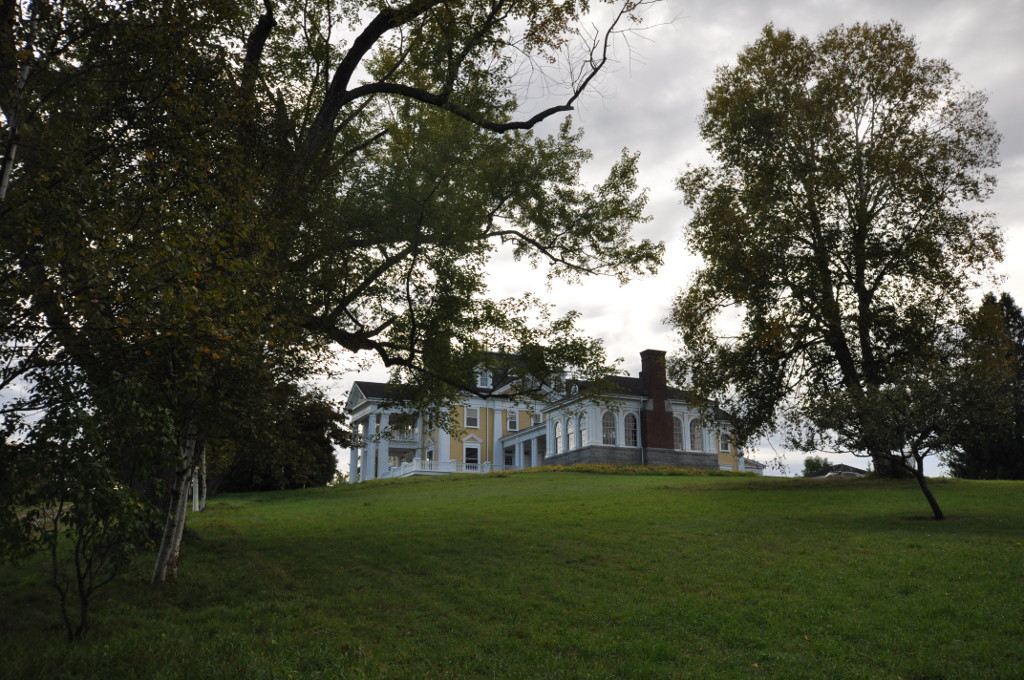

- Location within Vermont Location within the United States
- Location: Darling Hill Rd., East Burke and Lyndon, Vermont
- Coordinates: 44°35′4″N 71°57′49″W
- Area: 86 acres (35 ha)
- Built: 1904
- Architect: Jardine, Kent & Jardine
- Architectural style: Neo-Georgian
- Part of: Darling Estate Historic District (ID10000911)
- NRHP reference No.: 73000191

Significant dates
- Added to NRHP: May 7, 1973
- Designated CP: August 23, 2011

Burklyn Hall is a historic estate house on Darling Hill Road, straddling the town line between Burke and Lyndon, Vermont, USA. Built in the early 1900s for Elmer Darling, a locally-born New York hotelier, it is one of Vermont's largest and most opulent Colonial Revival houses, and was the centerpiece of a large country estate. It was listed on the National Register of Historic Places in 1973.

== Description and history ==
Burklyn Hall is located at the highest point of the Darling Hill ridge, which extends north–south in northeastern Lyndon and southern Burke. The house is a large three-story wood-frame structure resting on a granite foundation. Its main section is square, covered by a hip roof with gabled dormers and a balustraded widow's walk at the center. Projecting south along the ridge is a long ell. The main entrance faces north, under a massive two-story Greek temple facade, and a porte-cochere on the west side is joined to an outbuilding housing a lavishly decorated billiard room. The interior, in particular the four great rooms of the main floor, feature elaborate carved woodwork and plaster moldings. There are formal gardens just south of the hall, separating it from a small conservatory.

Elmer Darling, a native of Burke, made a fortune operating the Fifth Avenue Hotel in New York City. Burklyn Hall (named for its position on the town line) was designed by the architectural firm Jardine, Kent & Jardine and built in 1904–08. It features amenities not normally found in domestic architecture of the period, including elevators and a central vacuuming system. It was the centerpiece of a country estate covering 1,400 acres (570 ha) (essentially all of Darling Hill), listed on the National Register as the Darling Estate Historic District.

In the mid-20th century, Burklyn Hall was used as a dormitory by Lyndon College.

== See also ==
- National Register of Historic Places listings in Caledonia County, Vermont
