= Mankato Public Library and Reading Room =

Former library building in Minnesota, United States

- U.S. National Register of Historic Places
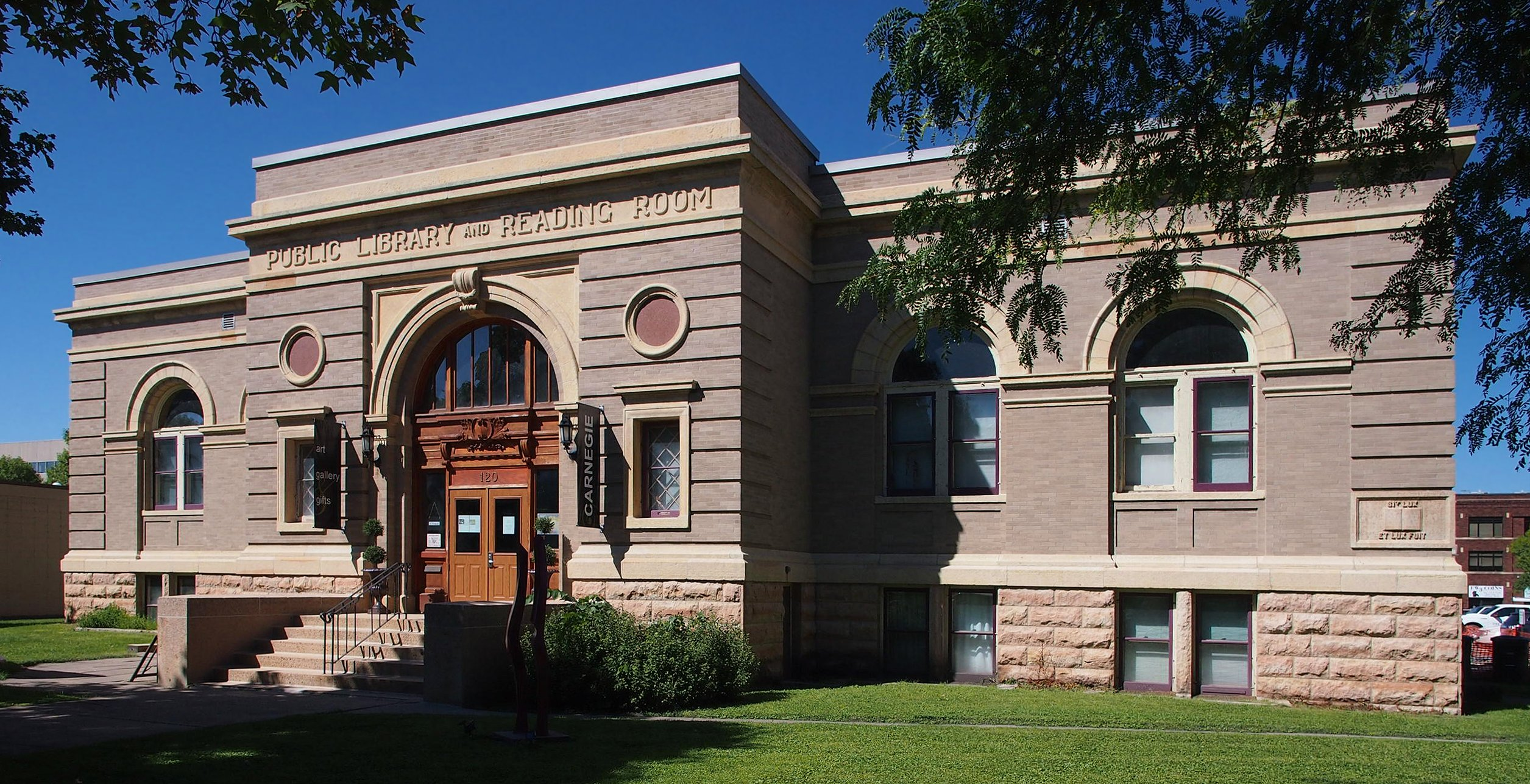
- The former Mankato Public Library and Reading Room from the east

- Location within Minnesota Location within the United States
- Location: 120 S. Broad Street, Mankato, Minnesota
- Coordinates: 44°9′56.8″N 94°0′3.5″W
- Area: Less than one acre
- Built: 1902–1903
- Built by: J.B. Nelson & Co.
- Architect: Jardine, Kent & Jardine
- Architectural style: Romanesque Revival
- NRHP reference No.: 80001952
- Added to NRHP: July 28, 1980

The Mankato Public Library and Reading Room is a former library building in Mankato, Minnesota, United States. It was built as a Carnegie library from 1902 to 1903 and housed Mankato's public library until 1977. The building was listed on the National Register of Historic Places in 1980 for its local significance in the themes of architecture and education. It was nominated for its association with the Carnegie library phenomenon and for its Renaissance Revival architecture using local materials.

The city of Mankato sold the building to the Mankato Area Arts Council in 1979. It housed a music education program and provided office space to various non-profit arts organizations. As of 2022, it operates as the Carnegie Art Center, with two art galleries, a gift shop of work by regional artists, and rental studio space.

== See also ==
- National Register of Historic Places listings in Blue Earth County, Minnesota
